= Cassette deck =

Tape machine for playing and recording audio compact cassettes

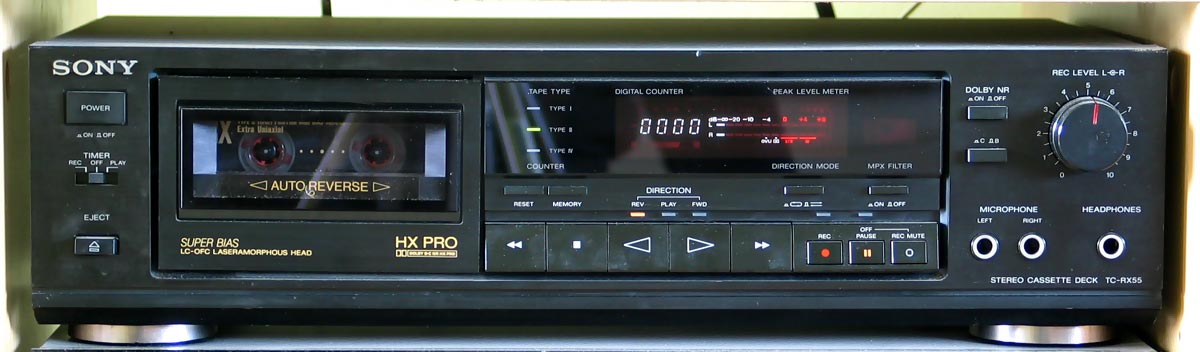
A typical late 1980s component deck with Dolby B, C and HXPro (Sony TC-RX55)

A cassette deck is a type of tape machine for playing and recording audio cassettes that does not have a built-in power amplifier or speakers, and serves primarily as a transport. In the 1980s and early 1990s, tape decks were commonly used in vehicle stereo systems, portable cassette players, and home component systems. In the latter case, it is also called a component cassette deck or just a component deck.

== History ==
=== Roots ===
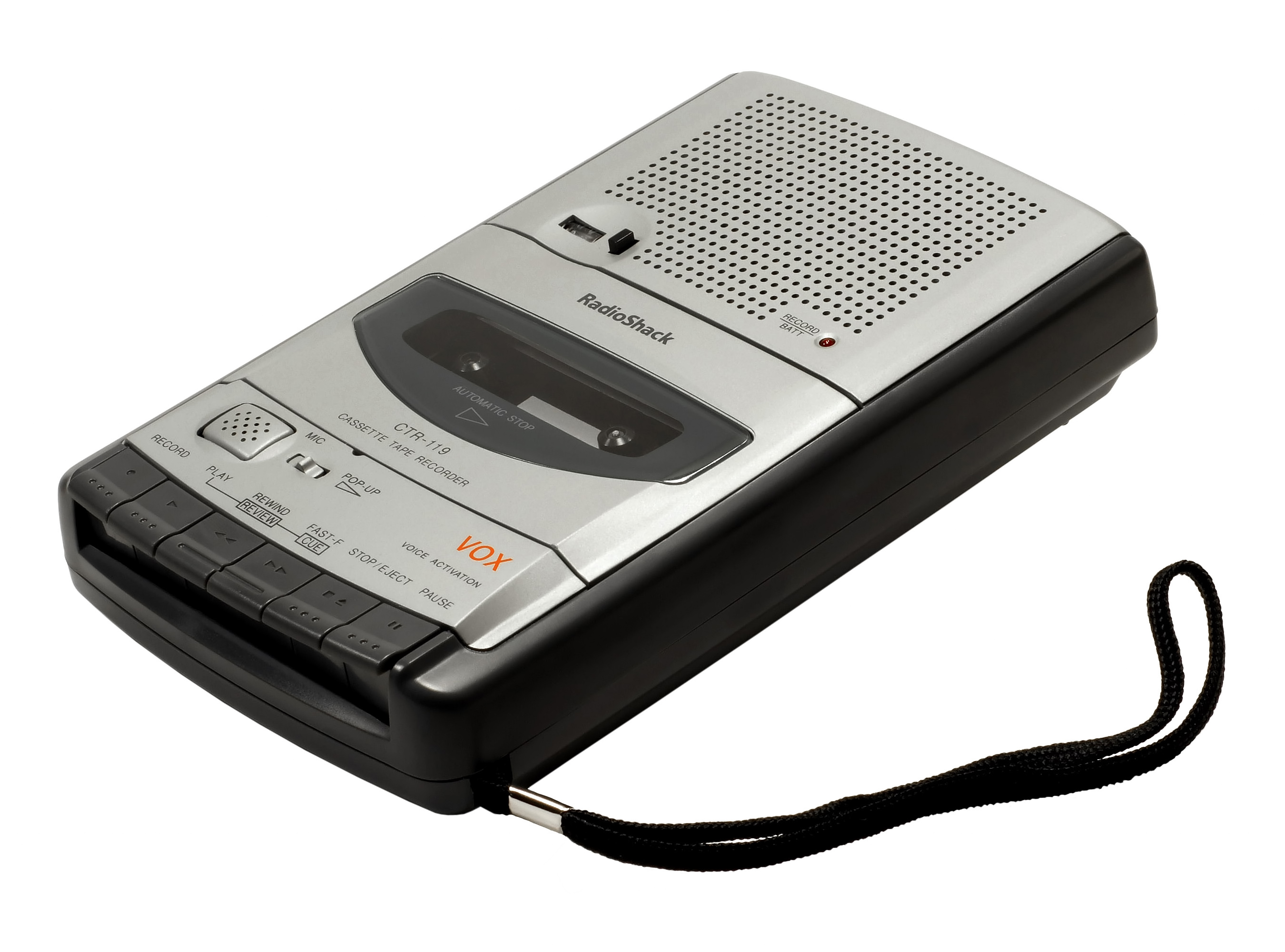
A typical portable desktop cassette recorder from RadioShack

The first consumer tape recorder to employ a tape reel permanently housed in a small removable cartridge was the RCA tape cartridge, which appeared in 1958 as a predecessor to the cassette format. At that time, reel-to-reel recorders and players were commonly used by enthusiasts but required large individual reels and tapes which had to be threaded by hand, making them less accessible to the casual consumer. Both RCA and Bell Sound attempted to commercialize the cartridge format, but a few factors stalled adoption, including lower-than-advertised availability of selections in the prerecorded media catalog, delays in production setup, and a stand-alone design that was not considered by audiophiles to be truly hi-fi.

The compact cassette (a Philips trademark) was introduced by the Philips Corporation at the Internationale Funkausstellung Berlin in 1963 and marketed as a device purely intended for portable speech-only dictation machines. The tape width was 1/8 inch (actually 0.15 inch, 3.81 mm) and tape speed was 1.875 inches (4.76 cm) per second, giving a decidedly non-Hi-Fi frequency response and quite high noise levels.

=== Early cassette decks ===
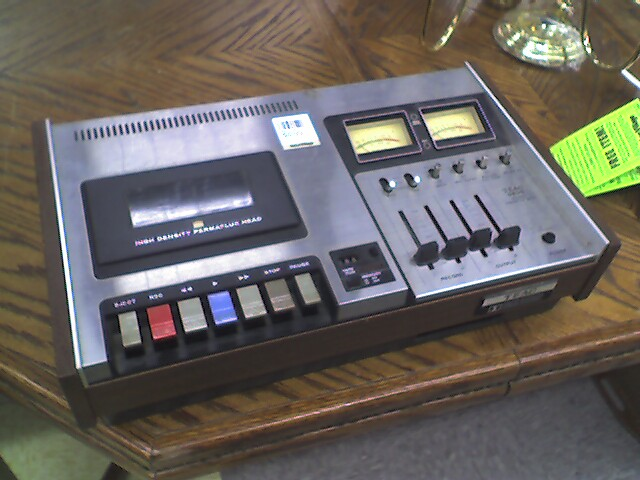
Typical top loading stereo cassette deck from mid-1970s

Early recorders were intended for dictation and journalists and were typically hand-held battery-powered devices with built-in microphones and automatic gain control on recording. Tape recorder audio quality had improved by the mid-1970s, and a cassette deck with manual level controls and VU meters became a standard component of home high-fidelity systems. Eventually the reel-to-reel recorder was completely displaced. There were usage constraints due to their large size, along with expense, and the inconvenience of threading and rewinding the tape reels. Cassettes are more portable and can be stopped and immediately removed in the middle of playback without rewinding. Cassettes became extremely popular for automotive and other portable music applications. Although pre-recorded cassettes were widely available, many users would combine (dub) songs from their vinyl records or other cassettes to make a new custom mixtape cassette.

In 1970, the Advent Corporation combined Dolby B noise reduction system with chromium dioxide (CrO_{2}) tape to create the Advent Model 200, the first high-fidelity cassette deck. Dolby B uses volume companding of high frequencies to boost low-level treble information by up to 9 dB, reducing them (and the hiss) on playback. CrO_{2} used different bias and equalization settings to reduce the overall noise level and extend the high-frequency response. Together, these allowed a usefully flat frequency response beyond 15 kHz for the first time. This deck was based on a top-loading mechanism by Nakamichi. The follow-on Model 201 was based on a more reliable transport made by Wollensak. Both models featured an unusual single VU meter that could be switched between the two or for both channels together. The Model 200 featured piano key style transport controls, with the Model 201 using the distinctive combination of a separate lever for rewind and fast forward, and the large play and stop button as found on Wollensak commercial reel-to-reel machines of the era.

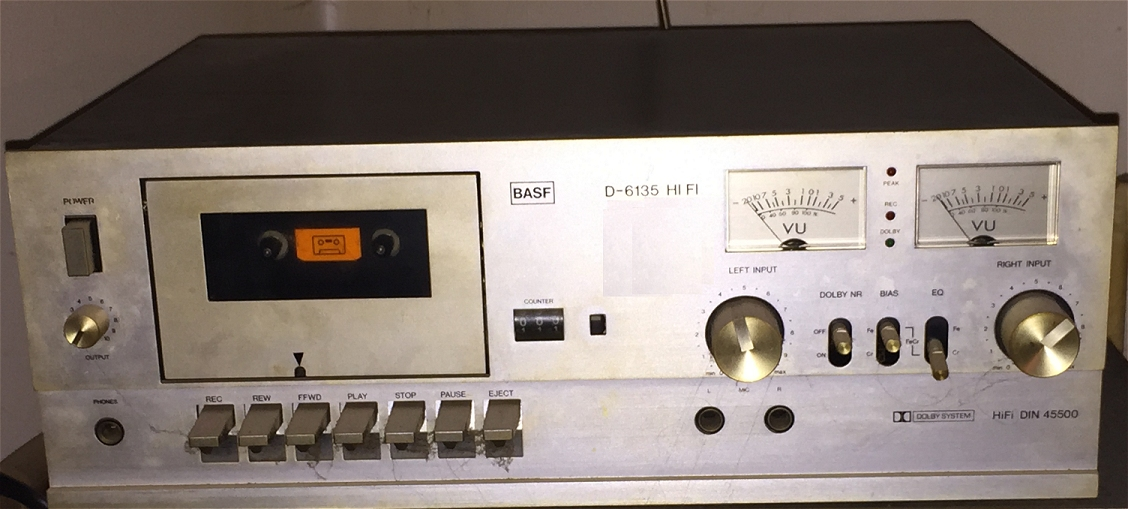
Typical front-loading deck from the late 1970s onward (BASF D-6135 introduced 1979)

Most manufacturers adopted a standard top-loading format with piano key controls, dual VU meters, and slider level controls. There was then a variety of configurations leading to the next standard format in the late 1970s, which settled on front-loading with cassette well on one side, dual VU meters on the other, and later dual-cassette decks with meters in the middle. Mechanical controls were replaced with electronic push buttons controlling solenoid mechanical actuators, though low-cost models would retain mechanical controls. Some models could search for and count gaps between songs.

=== Widespread use ===
Cassette decks soon came into widespread use in applications such as home audio systems, mobile use in cars, and portable recorders. From the mid-1970s to the late 1990s, the cassette deck was the preferred music source for the automobile. Like an 8-track cartridge, it is relatively insensitive to vehicle motion, but has a smaller physical size and fast-forward and rewind capability.

A major boost to the cassette's popularity came with the release of the Sony Walkman personal cassette player in 1979, designed specifically as a headphone-only ultra-compact wearable music source. Although the vast majority of such players eventually sold were not Sony products, the name Walkman has become synonymous with this type of device.

Cassette decks were eventually manufactured by most of the well-known brands in home audio, and many in professional audio.

=== Performance improvements and additional features ===
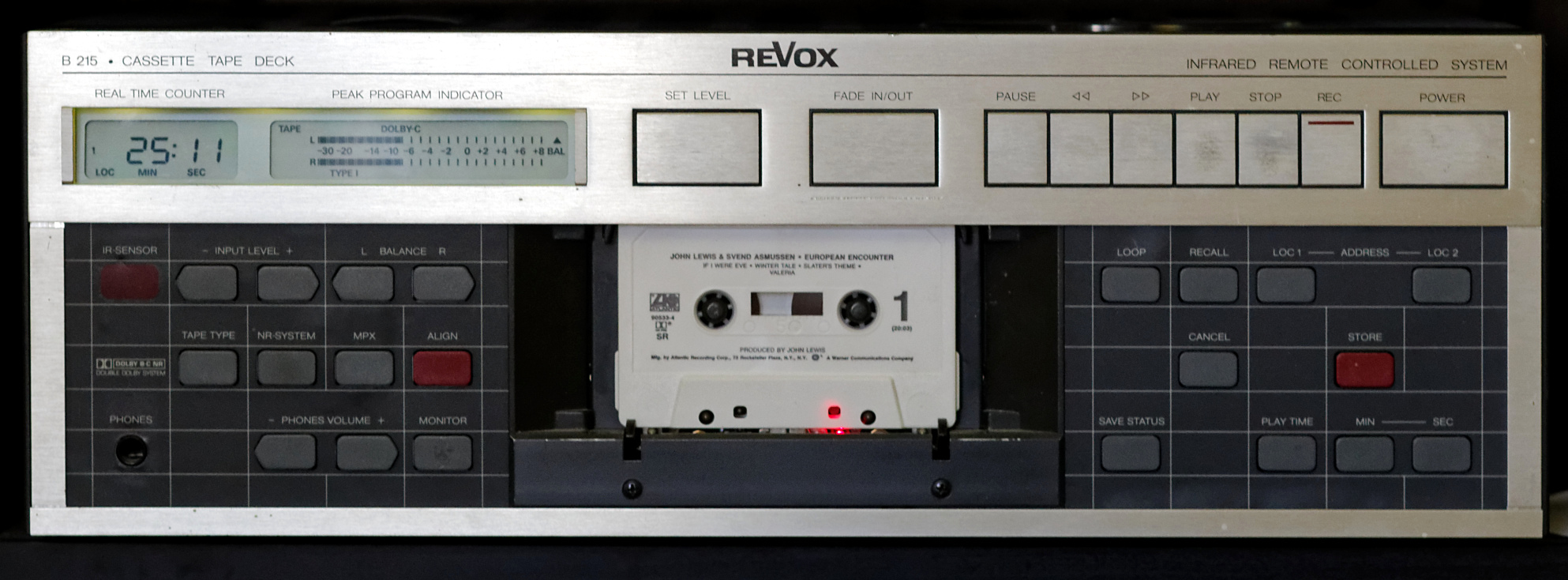
Revox B 215, 4-motor-cassette deck without belts (direct drive, 1985–1992)

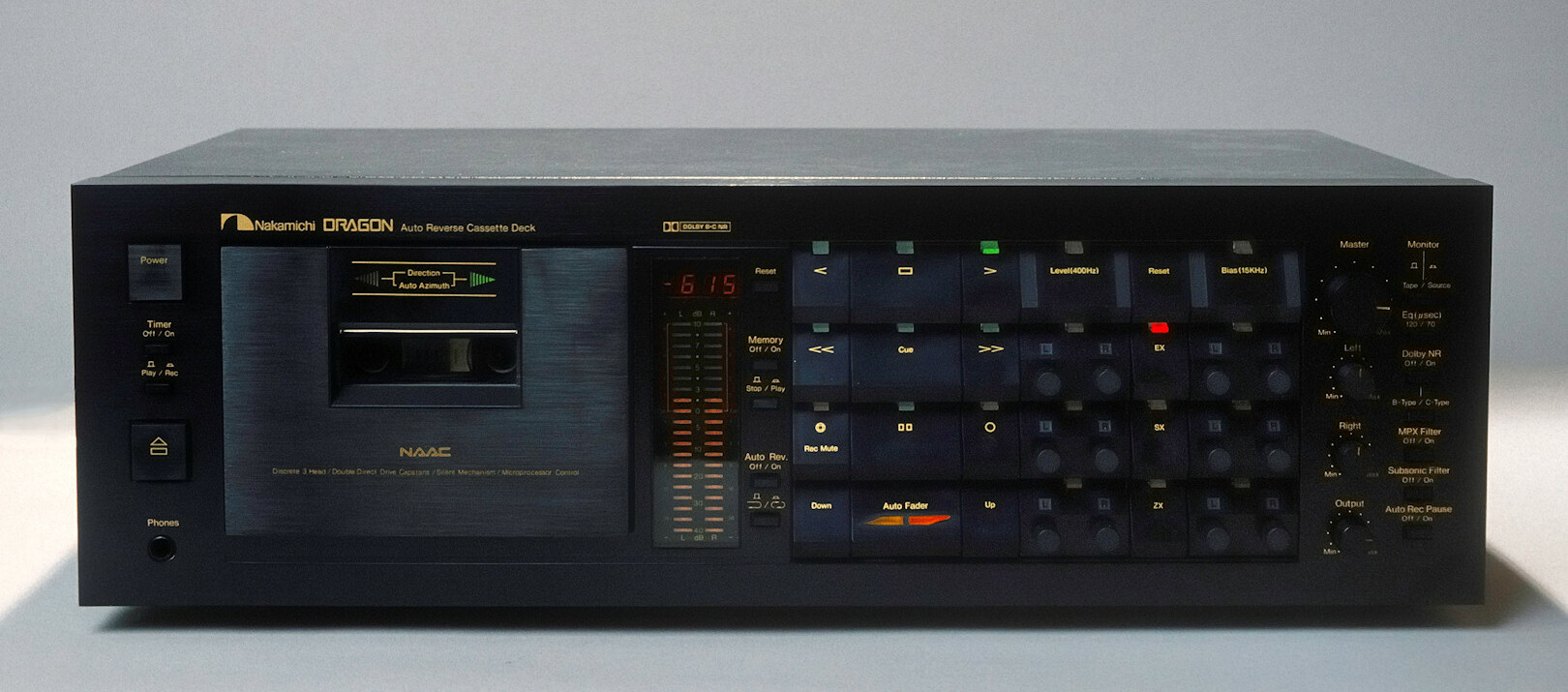
Nakamichi Dragon cassette deck with azimuth adjustment 1983–1993, 1995 (Last Edition)

Cassette decks reached their pinnacle of performance and complexity by the mid-1980s. Cassette decks from companies such as Nakamichi, Revox, and Tandberg incorporated advanced features such as multiple tape heads and dual-capstan drive with separate reel motors. Auto-reversing decks became popular and were standard on most factory-installed automobile players.

==== Integrated noise-reduction systems – Dolby B, C, and S ====
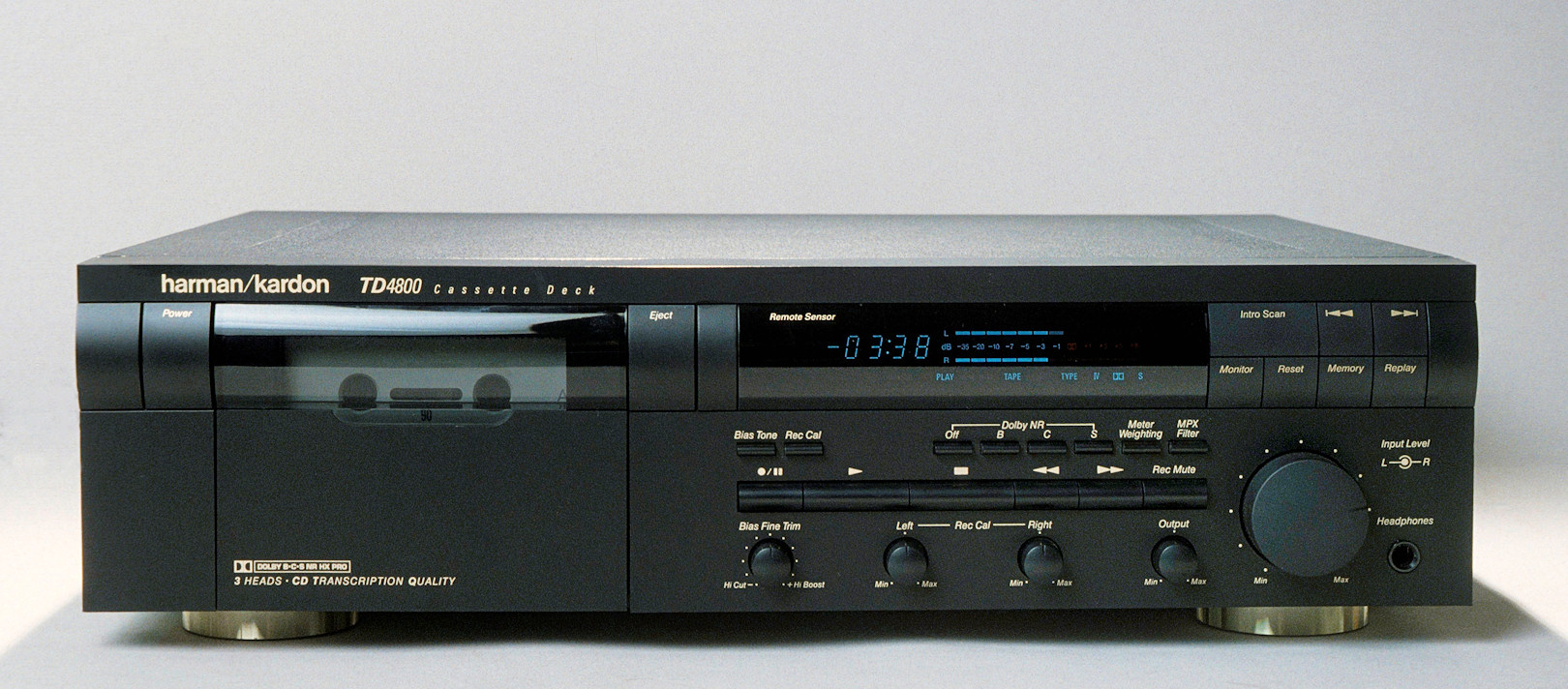
Dolby S cassette deck by harman/kardon (1990)

The Dolby B noise-reduction system was key to realizing low noise performance on the, compared to reel-to-reel technology, relatively slow and narrow cassette tapes. It works by boosting the high frequencies on recording, especially low-level high-frequency sounds, with corresponding high-frequency reduction on playback. This lowers the high-frequency noise (hiss) by approximately 9 dB. Enhanced versions included Dolby C (from 1980) and Dolby S types. Of the three, however, only Dolby B became common on automobile decks.

==== Three heads for real-time monitoring of recordings and improved sound quality ====
Three-head technology uses separate heads for recording and playback, with the third of the three heads being the erase head. This allows different record and playback head gaps to be used. A narrower head gap is more optimal for playback than for recording, so the head gap width of any combined record/playback head must necessarily be a compromise. Separate record and playback heads also allow off-the-tape monitoring during recording, permitting immediate verification of the recording quality. (Note: Such machines can be identified by the presence of a monitor switch with positions for tape and source, or similar.) Three-head systems were common on reel-to-reel decks, but were more difficult to implement for cassettes, which do not provide separate openings for record and play heads. Some models squeezed a monitor head into the capstan area, and others combined separate record and playback gaps into a single headshell.

==== Auto reverse for automated sequential playback of both cassette sides ====
In later years, an auto-reverse feature appeared that allowed the deck to play (and, in some decks, record) on both sides of the cassette without the operator having to manually remove, flip, and re-insert the cassette. Most auto-reverse machines use a four-channel head, one pair for each direction, with only two channels connected to the electronics at a time. Auto-reverse decks employ a roller for each side. Since the second capstan and pinch roller use the same opening in the cassette shell normally used for the erase head, such decks must fit the erase head into the center opening in the shell along with the record and play head.

Beginning in 1978, the auto reverse function may involve a standard two-track, quarter-width head assembly mounted on a small turntable that ducks down out of the tape path, mechanically rotates the head assembly 180 degrees, and quickly returns to the tape path so that the two head gaps access the other tracks of the tape as the reel and capstan motors reverse the tape direction. Sony introduced this solution in 1978, and JVC produced similar models in 1983. There is usually an azimuth adjustment screw for each head position. Nevertheless, due to the repeated movement, the alignment (in particular, the azimuth) deviates with usage. Even in a machine with a four-channel head, slight asymmetries in the cassette shell make it difficult to align the head perfectly for both directions.

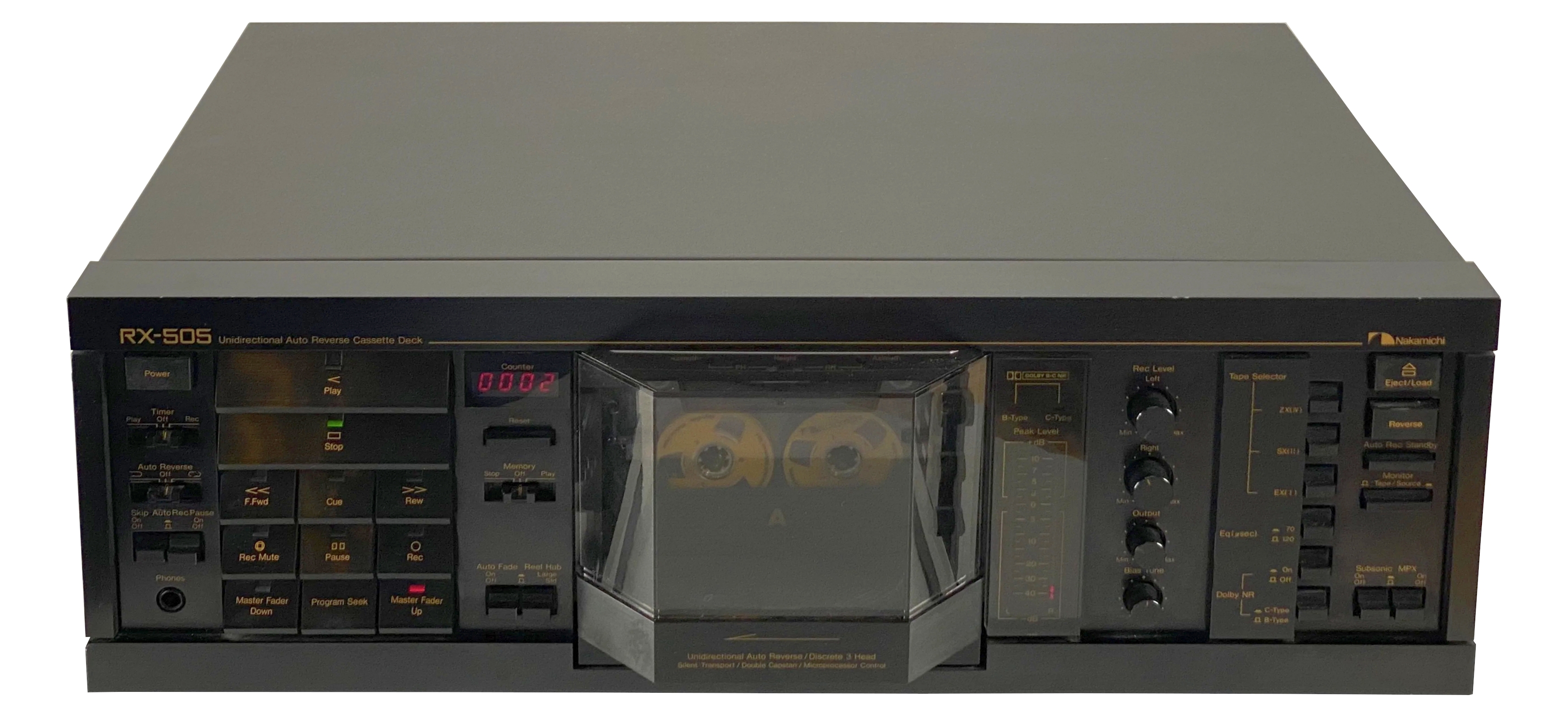
Nakamichi RX series RX-505 deck

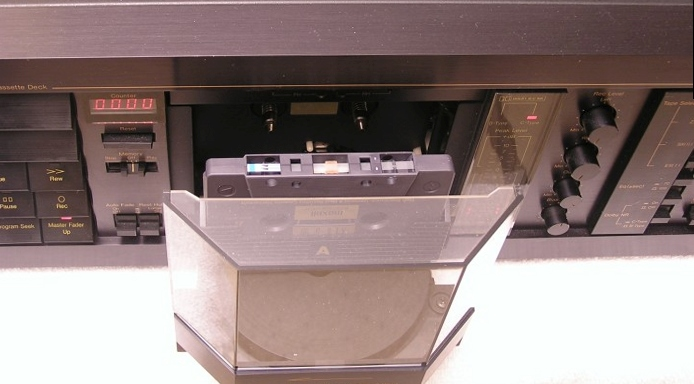
RX-505 auto reverse mechanism

In one machine, the Dragon, Nakamichi addressed the issue with a motor-driven automatic head alignment mechanism. This proved effective but very expensive. Later Nakamichi auto-reverse models, the RX series, were essentially single-directional decks, but with an added mechanism that physically removed the cassette from the transport, flipped it over, and re-inserted it. Akai made a similar machine, but with the mechanism and cassette laid out horizontally instead of upright. This permitted the convenience of auto-reverse with little compromise in record or playback quality.

==== Integration of digital electronics, from the 1980s ====
As a part of the Digital Revolution, the ongoing development of electronics technology decreased the cost of digital circuitry to the point that the technology could be applied to consumer electronics. The application of such digital electronics to cassette decks provides an early example of mechatronic design, which aims to enhance mechanical systems with electronic components in order to improve performance, increase system flexibility, or reduce cost. The inclusion of logic circuitry and solenoids into the transport and control mechanisms of cassette decks, often referred to logic control, contrasts with earlier piano-key transport controls and mechanical linkages. One goal of using logic circuitry in cassette decks or recorders was to minimize equipment damage upon incorrect user input by including fail-safes into the transport and control mechanism. Such fail-safe behavior was described in a review by Julian Hirsch of a particular cassette deck featuring logic control. Some examples of fail-safe mechanisms incorporated into logic control decks include: a mechanism designed to protect internal components from damage when the tape or motor is locked and a mechanism designed to prevent the tape from being wound improperly. Some logic control decks were designed to incorporate light-touch buttons or remote control, among other features marketed as being convenient. In the car stereo industry, full logic control was developed with the aim of miniaturization, so that the cassette deck would take up less dashboard space.

==== Dolby HX Pro for higher recording levels on the same tape material ====
Bang & Olufsen developed the HX Pro headroom extension system in conjunction with Dolby Laboratories in 1982. This was used in many higher-end decks. HX Pro reduces the high-frequency bias during recording when the signal being recorded has a high level of high-frequency content. Such a signal is self-biasing. Reducing the level of the bias signal permits the desired signal to be recorded at a higher level without saturating the tape, thus increasing headroom and improving signal-to-noise ratio.

==== Advances in tape materials ====
Chromium dioxide (referred to as CrO_{2} or Type II) was the first tape designed for extended high-frequency response, but it required higher bias. Later, as the IEC Type II standard was defined, different equalization settings were also mandated to reduce hiss, thus giving up some extension at the high end of the audio spectrum. Cassette recorders soon appeared with a switch for the tape type. Later decks incorporated coded holes in the shell to detect the tape type.

Chromium dioxide tape was thought to cause increased wear on the heads, so TDK and Maxell adapted cobalt-doped ferric formulations to mimic CrO_{2}. Sony briefly tried FerriChrome (Type III), which claimed to combine the best of both; some people, however, stated that the reverse was true because the Cr top layer seemed to wear off quickly, reducing this type to Fe in practice.

Most recent decks produce the best response and dynamic headroom with metal tapes (IEC Type IV), which require still higher bias for recording, though they will play back correctly at the II setting since the equalization is the same.

With all of these improvements, the best units could record and play the full audible spectrum from 20 Hz to over 20 kHz (although this was commonly specified at -10, -20 or even -30 dB, not at full output level), with wow and flutter less than 0.05% and very low noise. A high-quality recording on cassette could rival the sound of an average commercial CD, though the quality of pre-recorded cassettes has been regarded by the general public as lower than could be achieved in a quality home recording. There was a call for better sound quality in 1981, surprisingly by the head of Tower Records, Russ Solomon. At a meeting of the National Association of Recording Merchandisers (NARM) Retail Advisory Committee in Carlsbad, California, Solomon played two recordings of a Santana track; one he had recorded himself and the pre-recorded cassette release from Columbia Records. He used this technique to demonstrate what he called "the tunnel effect" in the audio range of pre-recorded cassettes and commented to the reporter Sam Sutherland, who wrote a news article printed in Billboard magazine:

"The buyer who is aware of sound quality is making his own." "They won't be satisfied with the 'tunnel effect' of prerecorded tape. And home tape deck users don't use prerecorded tapes at all." Yet, contended Solomon, while Tower's own stores show strong blank tape sales gains, its prerecorded sales have increased by only 2% to 3%. With an estimated 15% of the chain's total tape business now generated by the sales of blanks, "it would appear our added tape sales are going to TDK, Maxell and Sony, not you." he concluded. — Billboard, Vol. 93, No. 38, 26 September 1981.

== Noise reduction and fidelity ==
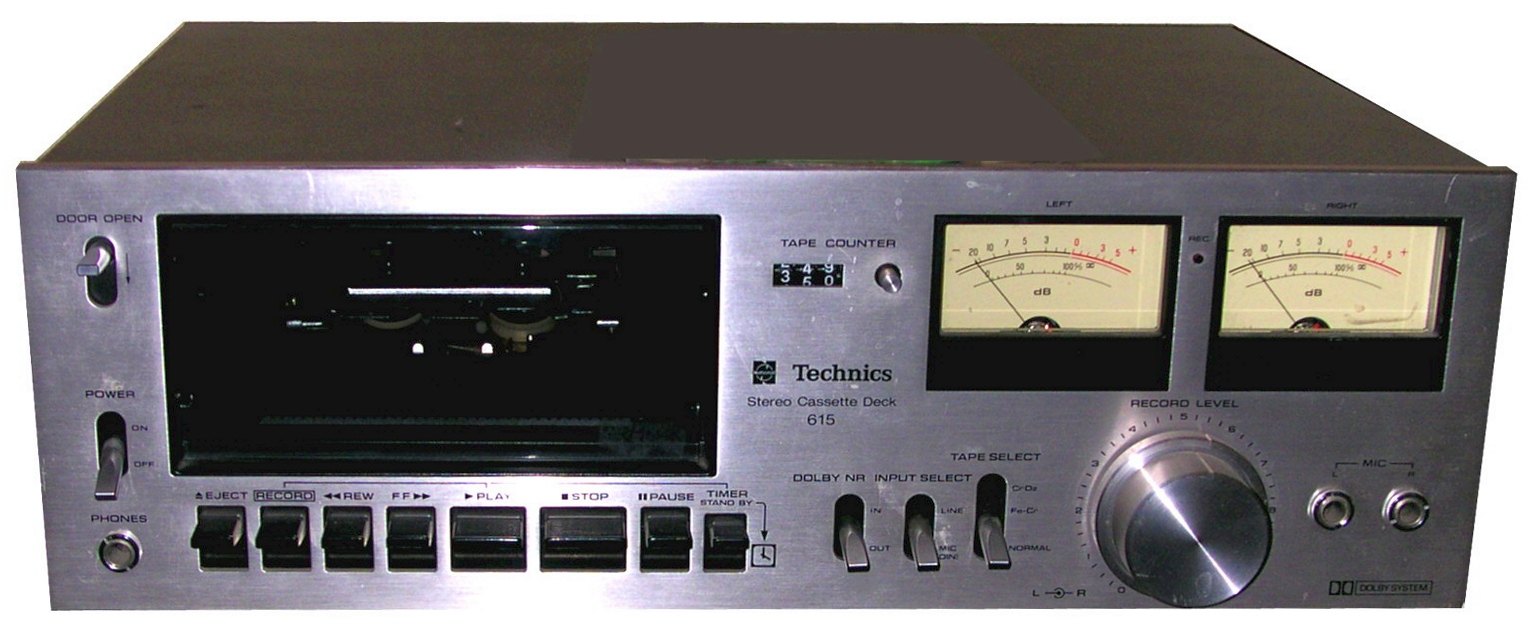
HiFi-Tapedeck by Technics with analog VU-meters (1977)

A variety of noise reduction and other schemes are used to increase fidelity, with Dolby B being almost universal for both prerecorded tapes and home recording. Dolby B was designed to address the high-frequency noise inherent in cassette tapes, and along with improvements in tape formulation, it helped the cassette win acceptance as a high-fidelity medium. At the same time, Dolby B provided acceptable performance when played back on decks that lacked Dolby circuitry, meaning there was little reason not to use it if it was available.

Initially, the main alternative to Dolby was the dbx noise-reduction system, which achieved a high signal-to-noise ratio, but was essentially unlistenable when played back on decks that lacked the dbx decoding circuitry.

Philips developed an alternative noise-reduction system known as Dynamic Noise Limiter (DNL) which did not require the tapes to be processed during recording; this was also the basis of the later Dynamic Noise Reduction.

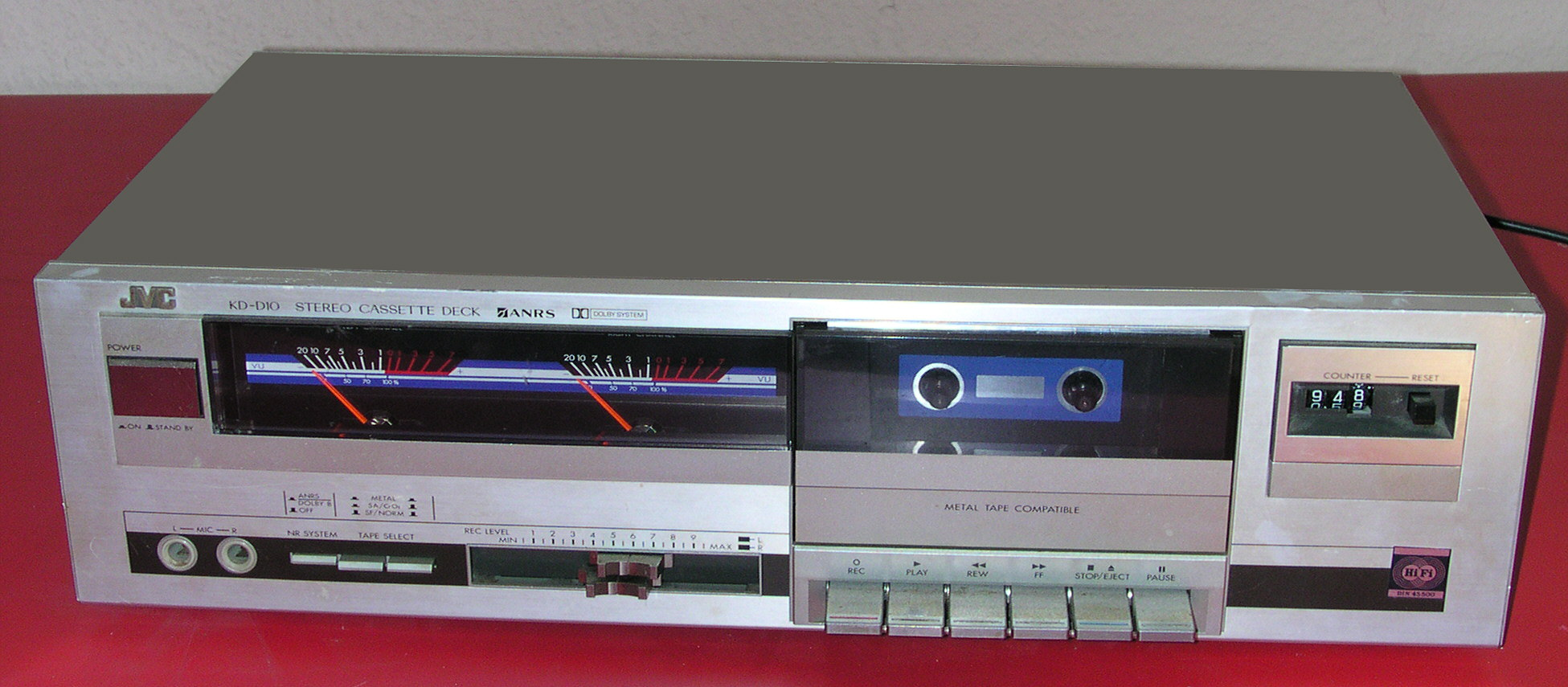
JVC KD-D10E with Dolby B

Dolby later introduced Dolby C and Dolby S noise reduction, which achieved higher levels of noise reduction; Dolby C became common on high-fidelity decks, but Dolby S, released when cassette sales had begun to decline, never achieved widespread use. It was only licensed for use on higher-end tape decks that included dual motors, triple heads, and other refinements.

Dolby HX Pro headroom extension provided better high-frequency response by adjusting the inaudible tape bias during the recording of strong high-frequency sounds, which had a bias effect of their own. Developed by Bang & Olufsen, it did not require a decoder to play back. Since B&O held patent rights and required paying license fees, many other manufacturers refrained from using it.

Other refinements to improve cassette performance included Tandberg's DYNEQ, Toshiba's adres and Telefunken's High Com, and on some high-end decks, automatic recording bias, fine pitch adjustment and head azimuth adjustment such as on the Tandberg TCD-330 and TCD-340A.

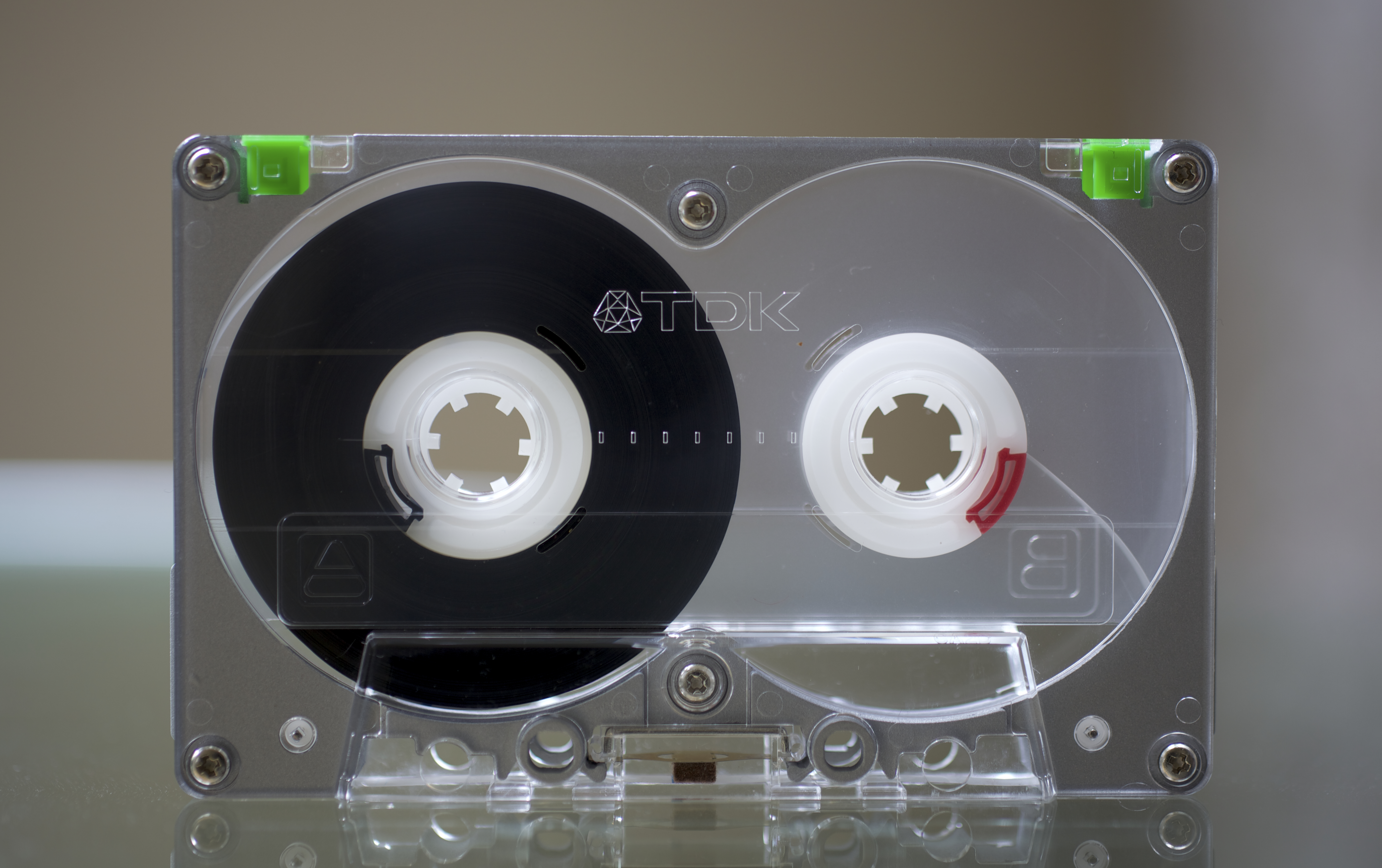
TDK MA-R90 cassette

By the late 1980s, due to such improvements in electronics, tape material and manufacturing techniques, as well as improvements to the precision of the cassette shell, tape heads and transport mechanics, sound fidelity on equipment from the top manufacturers surpassed the levels originally expected of the medium. On suitable audio equipment, cassettes could produce a high-quality listening experience. High-end cassette decks could achieve 15 Hz – 22 kHz ±3 dB frequency response with wow and flutter below 0.022%, and a signal-to-noise ratio of up to 61 dB (for Type IV tape, without noise-reduction). With noise reduction, typical signal-to-noise figures of 70–76 dB with Dolby C, 80–86 dB with Dolby S, and 85–90 dB with dbx could be achieved.

From the early 1980s, the fidelity of prerecorded cassettes began to improve dramatically. Whereas Dolby B was already in widespread use in the 1970s, prerecorded cassettes were duplicated onto rather poor-quality tape stock, often at high speed, and did not compare in fidelity to high-grade LPs. However, systems such as XDR, along with the adoption of higher-grade tape, (Note: Such as chromium dioxide, but typically recorded in such a way as to play back at the normal 120 μs position) and the frequent use of Dolby HX Pro, meant that cassettes became a viable high-fidelity option, one that was more portable and required less maintenance than LPs. In addition, cover art, which had generally previously been restricted to a single image of the LP cover along with a minimum of text, began to be tailored to cassettes as well, with fold-out lyric sheets or librettos and fold-out sleeves becoming commonplace.

Some companies, such as Mobile Fidelity, produced audiophile cassettes in the 1980s, which were recorded on high-grade tape and duplicated on premium equipment in real time from a digital master. Unlike audiophile LPs, which continue to attract a following, these were discontinued after the compact disc became widespread.

Almost all cassette decks have an MPX filter to improve the sound quality and the tracking of the noise-reduction system when recording from an FM stereo broadcast. However, in many, especially cheaper decks, this filter cannot be disabled, and because of that, the record and playback frequency response in those decks typically is limited to 16 kHz. In other decks, the MPX filter can be switched independently of the noise reduction. On yet other decks, the filter is off by default, and an option to switch it on or off is only provided when noise reduction is activated; this prevents the MPX filter from being used when it's not required.

== In-car entertainment systems ==
A key element of the cassette's success was its use in vehicle audio systems, where the small size of the tape was significantly more convenient than the competing 8-track cartridge system. Cassette players in cars and for home use were often integrated with a radio receiver. In-car cassette players were the first to adopt automatic reverse of the tape direction at each end, allowing a cassette to be played endlessly without manual intervention. Home cassette decks soon added the feature.

Cassette tape adaptors have been developed which allow newer media players to be played through existing cassette decks, in particular those in cars which generally do not have input jacks. These units do not suffer from reception problems associated with personal FM transmitters.

== Maintenance ==
Cassette equipment needs regular maintenance, as cassette tape is a magnetic medium that is in physical contact with the tape head and other metallic parts of the recorder/player mechanism.

Tape heads will require occasional cleaning to remove iron oxide (or similar) particles from tape that become attached to or lodged in the playback head. The metal capstan and the rubber pinch roller can become coated with these particles, leading them to pull the tape less precisely over the head. Isopropyl alcohol and denatured alcohol are both suitable head-cleaning fluids.

The heads and other metallic components in the tape path (such as spindles and capstans) may become magnetized with use, and require demagnetizing (see Cassette demagnetizer).

== Decline in popularity ==
Analog cassette deck sales were expected to decline rapidly with the advent of the compact disc and other digital recording technologies such as digital audio tape (DAT), MiniDisc, and the CD-R recorder drives. Philips responded with the digital compact cassette, a system which was backward-compatible with existing analog cassette recordings for playback. However, it failed to garner a significant market share and was withdrawn from the market. One reason proposed for the lack of acceptance of digital recording formats such as DAT was a fear by content providers that the ability to make very high-quality copies would hurt sales of copyrighted recordings.

The rapid transition was not realized, and CDs and cassettes successfully co-existed for nearly 20 years. A contributing factor may have been the inability of early CD players to reliably read discs with surface damage and offer anti-skipping features for applications where external vibration would be present, such as automotive and recreation environments. Early CD playback equipment also tended to be expensive compared to cassette equipment of similar quality and did not offer recording capability. Many home and portable entertainment systems supported both formats and commonly allowed the CD playback to be recorded on cassette tape. The rise of inexpensive all-solid-state portable digital music systems based on MP3, AAC and similar formats finally saw the eventual decline of the domestic cassette deck. As of 2020, Marantz, Teac, and Tascam are among the few companies still manufacturing cassette decks in relatively small quantities for professional and niche market use. By the late 1990s, automobiles were offered with entertainment systems that played both cassettes and CDs. By the end of the late 2000s, very few cars were offered with cassette decks. The last vehicle model in the United States that came standard with a factory-installed cassette player was the 2010 Lexus SC 430; however, the Ford Crown Victoria came with a cassette deck as an option until the model was discontinued in 2011. As radios became tightly integrated into dashboards, many cars lacked even standard openings that would accept aftermarket cassette player installations.

Despite the decline in the production of cassette decks, these products are still valued by some. Many blind and elderly people find the newest digital technologies very difficult to use compared to the cassette format. Cassette tapes are not vulnerable to scratching from handling (though the exposed magnetic tape is vulnerable to stretching from poking), and play from where they were last stopped (though some modern MP3 players offer savestating electronically). Cassette tapes can also be recorded multiple times (though some solid-state digital recorders are now offering that function).

Today, cassette decks are not considered by most people to be either the most versatile or highest fidelity sound recording devices available, as even very inexpensive CD or digital audio players can reproduce a wide frequency range with no speed variations. Many current budget-oriented cassette decks lack a tape selector to set proper bias and equalization settings to take best advantage of the extended high end of Type II [High Bias] and Type IV [Metal Bias] tapes.

Cassettes remain popular for audio-visual applications. Some CD recorders, particularly those intended for business use, incorporate a cassette deck to allow both formats for recording meetings, church sermons, and books on tape.
