= Remaster =

Process of changing the quality of previously created media

A remaster is a change in the sound or image quality of previously created forms of media, whether audiophonic, cinematic, or videographic. The resulting product is said to be remastered. The terms digital remastering and digitally remastered are also used.

In a wider sense, remastering a product may involve other, typically smaller inclusions or changes to the content itself. They tend to be distinguished from remakes, based on the original.

== Mastering ==
A master recording is the definitive recording version that will be replicated for the end user, commonly into other formats (e.g. LP records, tapes, CDs, DVDs, Blu-rays, etc.).

A batch of copies is often made from a single original master recording, which might itself be based on previous recordings. For example, sound effects (e.g. a door opening, punching sounds, falling down the stairs, a bell ringing) might have been added from copies of sound effect tapes similar to modern sampling to make a radio play for broadcast.

Problematically, several different levels of masters often exist for any one audio release. As an example, examine the way a typical music album from the 1960s was created. Musicians and vocalists were recorded on multi-track tape. This tape was mixed to create a stereo or mono master. A further master tape would likely be created from this original master recording consisting of equalization and other adjustments and improvements to the audio to make it sound better on record players for example.

More master recordings would be duplicated from the equalized master for regional copying purposes (for example to send to several pressing plants). Pressing masters for vinyl recordings would be created. Often these interim recordings were referred to as mother tapes. All vinyl records would derive from one of the master recordings.

Thus, mastering refers to the process of creating a master. This might be as simple as copying a tape for further duplication purposes or might include the actual equalization and processing steps used to fine-tune material for release. The latter example usually requires the work of mastering engineers.

With the advent of digital recording in the late 1970s, many mastering ideas changed. Previously, creating new masters meant incurring an analog generational loss; in other words, copying a tape to a tape meant reducing the signal-to-noise ratio. This means how much of the original intended "good" information is recorded against faults added to the recording as a result of the technical limitations of the equipment used (noise, e.g. tape hiss, static, etc.). Although noise reduction techniques exist, they also increase other audio distortions such as azimuth shift, wow and flutter, print-through and stereo image shift.

With digital recording, masters could be created and duplicated without incurring the usual generational loss. As CDs were a digital format, digital masters created from original analog recordings became a necessity.

== Remastering ==
Remastering is the process of making a new master for an album, film, or any other creation. It tends to refer to the process of porting a recording from an analog medium to a digital one, but this is not always the case.

For example, a vinyl LP – originally pressed from a worn-out pressing master many tape generations removed from the "original" master recording – could be remastered and re-pressed from a better-condition tape. All CDs created from analog sources are technically digitally remastered.

The process of creating a digital transfer of an analog tape remasters the material in the digital domain, even if no equalization, compression, or other processing is done to the material. Ideally, because of their higher resolution, a CD or DVD (or even higher quality like high-resolution audio or hi-def video) release should come from the best source possible, with the most care taken during its transfer.

Additionally, the earliest days of the CD era found digital technology in its infancy, which sometimes resulted in poor-sounding digital transfers. The early DVD era was not much different, with copies of films frequently being produced from worn prints, with low bit rates and muffled audio. When the first CD remasters turned out to be bestsellers, companies soon realized that new editions of back-catalog items could compete with new releases as a source of revenue. Back-catalog values skyrocketed, and today it is not unusual to see expanded and remastered editions of relatively modern albums.

Master tapes, or something close to them, can be used to make CD releases. Better processing choices can be used. Better prints can be utilized, with sound elements remixed to 5.1 surround sound and obvious print flaws digitally corrected. The modern era gives publishers almost unlimited ways to touch up, doctor, and "improve" their media, and as each release promises improved sound, video, extras and others, producers hope these upgrades will entice people into making a purchase.

=== Music ===
Remastering music for CD or even digital distribution starts from locating the original analog version. The next step involves digitizing the track or tracks so it can be edited using a computer. Then the track order is chosen. This is something engineers often worry about because if the track order is not right, it may seem sonically unbalanced.

When the remastering starts, engineers use software tools such as a limiter, an equalizer, and a compressor. The compressor and limiters are ways of controlling the loudness of a track. This is not to be confused with the volume of a track, which is controlled by the listener during playback.

The dynamic range of an audio track is measured by calculating the variation between the loudest and the quietest part of a track. In recording studios the loudness is measured with negative decibels, zero designating the loudest recordable sound. A limiter works by having a certain cap on the loudest parts and if that cap is exceeded, it is automatically lowered by a ratio preset by the engineer.

==== Criticism ====
Remastered audio has been the subject of criticism. Many remastered CDs from the late 1990s onwards have been affected by the "loudness war", where the average volume of the recording is increased and dynamic range is compressed at the expense of clarity, making the remastered version sound louder at regular listening volume and more distorted than an uncompressed version. Some have also criticized the overuse of noise reduction in the remastering process, as it affects not only the noise, but the signal too, and can leave audible artifacts. Equalisation can change the character of a recording noticeably. As EQ decisions are a matter of taste to some degree, they are often the subject of criticism. Mastering engineers such as Steve Hoffman have noted that using flat EQ on a mastering allows listeners to adjust the EQ on their equipment to their own preference, but mastering a release with a certain EQ means that it may not be possible to get a recording to sound right on high-end equipment. Additionally, from an artistic point of view, original mastering involved the original artist, but remastering often does not. Therefore, a remastered record may not sound how the artist originally intended.

=== Film and television ===
To remaster a film digitally for DVD and Blu-ray, digital restoration operators must scan in the film frame by frame at a resolution of at least 2,048 pixels across (referred to as 2K resolution). Some films are scanned at 4K, 6K, or even 8K resolution to be ready for higher resolution devices. Scanning a film at 4K—a resolution of 4096 × 3092 for a full frame of film—generates at least 12 terabytes of data before any editing is done.

Digital restoration operators then use specialist software such as MTI's Digital Restoration System (DRS) to remove scratches and dust from damaged film. Restoring the film to its original color is also included in this process.

As well as remastering the video aspect, the audio is also remastered using such software as Pro Tools to remove background noise and boost dialogue volumes so when actors are speaking they are easier to understand and hear. Audio effects are also added or enhanced, as well as surround sound, which allows the soundtrack elements to be spread among multiple speakers for a more immersive experience.

An example of a restored film is the 1939 film The Wizard of Oz. The color portions of Oz were shot in the three-strip Technicolor process, which in the 1930s yielded three black and white negatives created from red, green and blue light filters which were used to print the cyan, magenta and yellow portions of the final printed color film answer print. These three negatives were scanned individually into a computer system, where the digital images were tinted and combined using proprietary software.

The cyan, magenta, and yellow records had suffered from shrinkage over the decades, and the software used in the restoration morphed all three records into the correct alignment. The software was also used to remove dust and scratches from the film by copying data, for example, from the cyan and yellow records to fix a blemish in the magenta record. Restoring the film made it possible to see precise visual details not visible on earlier home releases: for example, when the Scarecrow says "I have a brain", burlap is noticeable on his cheeks. It was also not possible to see a rivet between the Tin Man's eyes prior to the restoration.

Shows that were shot and edited entirely on film, such as Star Trek: The Original Series, are able to be re-released in HD through re-scanning the original film negatives; the remastering process for the show additionally enabled Paramount to digitally update certain special effects. Shows that were made between the early 1980s and the early 2000s were generally shot on film, then transferred to and edited on standard-definition videotape, making high-definition transfers difficult, until the iConform system and other automated conforming tools were used to remaster the X files. After that some 40 shows have been remastered with this process, such as with the HD release of Star Trek: The Next Generation, which cost Paramount over $12 million to produce. In 2014, Pee-wee's Playhouse was digitally remastered from the original film and audio tracks.

==== Criticism ====
Remastered films have been the subject of criticism. When the Arnold Schwarzenegger film Predator was remastered in the late 2000s, Digital Noise Reduction was applied, resulting in Schwarzenegger's skin looking waxy. Recent remasters have corrected this. As well as complaints about the way the picture looks, there have been other complaints about digital fixing. One notable complaint is from the 2002 remastered version of E.T. the Extra-Terrestrial (1982), where director Steven Spielberg replaced guns in the hands of police and federal agents with walkie-talkies. A later 30th-anniversary edition released in 2012 saw the return of the original scene.

=== Animation ===
With regard to animation—both for television and film—"remastering" can take on a different context, including altering original images to extremes.

For traditionally animated projects, completed on cels and printed to film, remastering can be as simple as touching up a film negative. There have been times where these revisions have been controversial: boxed DVD sets of animated properties like Looney Tunes from the early 2000s saw extensive criticism from fans and historians due to the aggressive use of digital video noise reduction (DVNR). The process was designed to automatically remove dust or specks from the image, but would mistake stray ink lines or smudges on the cel for damage, as well as removing natural imperfections. Disney went a step farther with its remastering of its canon catalog in the early 21st century: for its cel-animated films, teams meticulously reconstructed scenes from original cel setups and background paintings to create new images free of film artifacts (jitter, grain, etc.). While complex and revolutionary, this process was criticized by some for essentially removing the films from their era and medium, making them indistinguishable in age. Later remasters, including a 4K restoration of Cinderella in 2023, prioritized a filmic look, with period-appropriate grain and weave.

Remastering other animated projects can vary in scope based on their art style. In the case of natively digital images, including computer-animated films, remastering can be a simple matter of going back to the original files and re-rendering them at a desired resolution. Some modern software, like Toon Boom Harmony, utilize lossless vector shapes, allowing an artist to re-render work at different resolutions with ease. This can prove tricky at times when files have become corrupted or unreadable; a 3D reissue of Toy Story, the first CG film, was fraught with difficulties due to the unreadability of the file format on modern systems. In television, South Park is an example of a program that was natively digital from its start—its construction paper style was made up of digital images manipulated in software like Maya. This allowed its creative team to completely re-render episodes in a higher resolution than its original broadcast; in some instances shots were re-framed to fit a 16:9 aspect ratio.

Another issue in terms of remastering is upscaling projects completed in the early days of digital ink and paint. Animation industries across the globe gradually switched from cels to digital coloring around the turn of the millennium, and projects that pre-date the advent of higher-resolution formats have proved challenging to remaster. Remasters of films that used early digipaint processes are typically struck from filmout 35mm prints, as the computer files were never properly archived. Projects that were composited on lower resolution formats like videotape have made going back to the original elements impractical due to their inferior size. Some studios have utilized artificial intelligence to professionally upscale the material; boutique label Discotek has released seasons of the anime Digimon using a specialized tool called AstroRes.

=== Video games ===
A comparison of Halo: Combat Evolved (left) and Halo: Combat Evolved Anniversary (right) with redrawn graphics. Anniversary features both the old and the new visuals in-game with a graphics-swapping feature.

Remastering a video game is more difficult than remastering a film or music recording because the video game's graphics show their age, even when the source code is used. This can be due to a number of factors, notably lower resolutions and less complicated rendering engines at the time of release. A video game remaster typically has ambience and design updated to the capabilities of a more powerful console, while a video game remake is also updated but with recreated models.

Modern computer monitors and high-definition televisions tend to have higher display resolutions and different aspect ratios than the monitors/televisions available when the video game was released. Because of this, classic games that are remastered typically have their graphics re-rendered at higher resolutions. An example of a game that has had its original graphics re-rendered at higher resolutions is Hitman HD Trilogy, which contains two games with high-resolution graphics: Hitman 2: Silent Assassin and Hitman: Contracts. Both were originally released on PC, PlayStation 2, and Xbox. The original resolution was 480p on Xbox, while the remastered resolution is displayed at 720p on Xbox 360. There is some debate regarding whether graphics of an older game at higher resolutions make a video game look better or worse than the original artwork, with comparisons made to colorizing black-and-white-films.

More significant than low resolution is the age of the original game engine and simplicity of the original 3D models. Older computers and video game consoles had limited 3D rendering speed, which required simple 3D object geometry such as human hands being modeled as mittens rather than with individual fingers, while maps having a distinctly chunky appearance with no smoothly curving surfaces. Older computers also had less texture memory for 3D environments, requiring low-resolution bitmap images that look visibly pixelated or blurry when viewed at high resolution. Some early 3D games such as the 1993 version of Doom also just used an animated two-dimensional image that is rotated to always face the player character, rather than attempt to render highly complex scenery objects or enemies in full 3D. As a result, depending on the age of the original game, if the original assets are not compatible with the new technology for a remaster, it is often considered necessary to remake or remodel the graphical assets. An example of a game that has had its graphics redesigned is Halo: Combat Evolved Anniversary, while the core character and level information is exactly the same as in Halo: Combat Evolved.

== See also ==
- Special edition
- Remake
