= Tachometer =

Instrument measuring the rotation speed of a shaft or disk

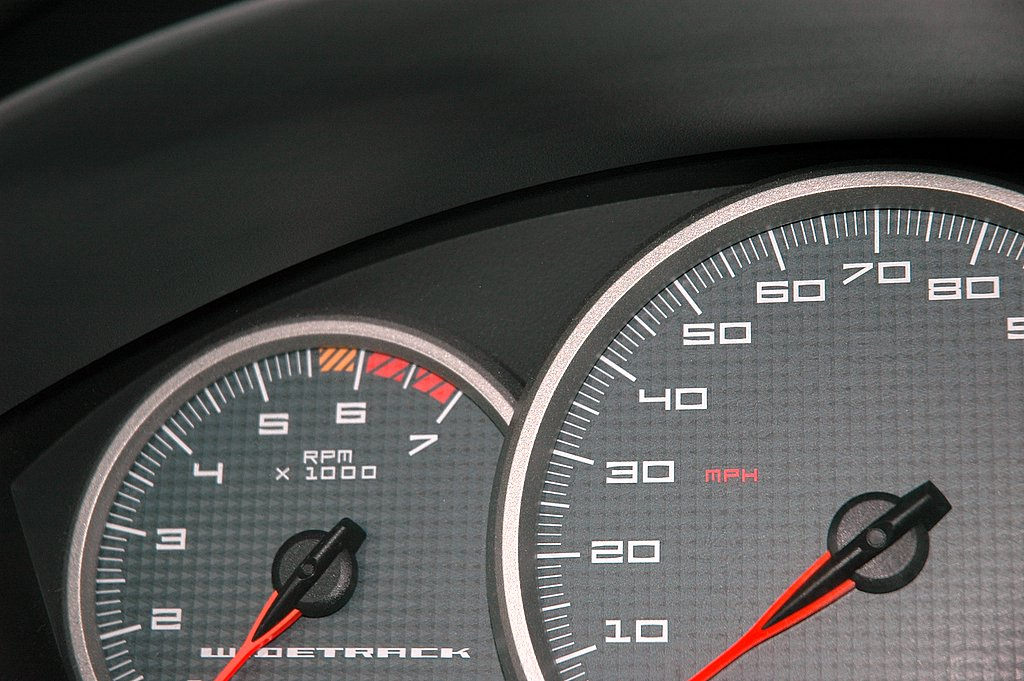
A tachometer that can indicate up to 7000 RPM (left)

A tachometer (revolution-counter, tach, rev-counter, RPM gauge) is an instrument measuring the rotation speed of a shaft or disk, as in a motor or other machine. The device usually displays the revolutions per minute (RPM) on a calibrated analogue dial, but digital displays are increasingly common.

The word comes from Ancient Greek τάχος (táchos) 'speed' and μέτρον (métron) 'measure'. Essentially the words tachometer and speedometer have identical meaning: a device that measures speed. It is by arbitrary convention that in the automotive world one is used for engine revolutions and the other for vehicle speed. In formal engineering nomenclature, more precise terms are used to distinguish the two.

== History ==
The first tachometer was described by Bryan Donkin in a paper to the Royal Society of Arts in 1810 for which he was awarded the Gold medal of the society. This consisted of a bowl of mercury constructed in such a way that centrifugal force caused the level in a central tube to fall when it rotated and brought down the level in a narrower tube above filled with coloured spirit. The bowl was connected to the machinery to be measured by pulleys.

The first mechanical tachometers were based on measuring the centrifugal force, similar to the operation of a centrifugal governor. The inventor is assumed to be the German engineer Dietrich Uhlhorn; he used it for measuring the speed of machines in 1817. Since 1840, it has been used to measure the speed of locomotives.

== In automobiles, trucks, tractors and aircraft ==
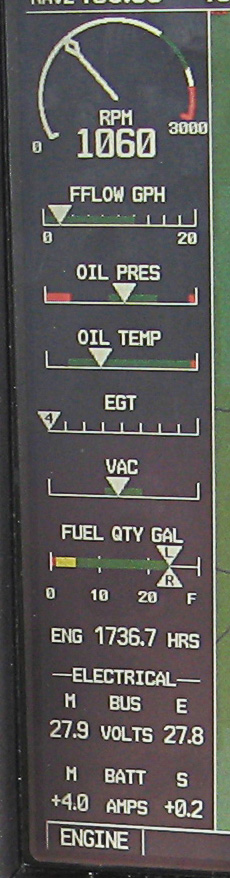
Cessna 172's G1000 tachometer (1,060 RPM) and engine hours (1736.7 hours)

Tachometers or revolution counters on cars, aircraft, and other vehicles show the rate of rotation of the engine's crankshaft, and typically have markings indicating a safe range of rotation speeds. This can assist the driver in selecting appropriate throttle and gear settings for the driving conditions. Prolonged use at high speeds may cause inadequate lubrication, overheating (exceeding capability of the cooling system), exceeding speed capability of sub-parts of the engine (for example spring retracted valves) thus causing excessive wear or permanent damage or failure of engines. On analogue tachometers, speeds above maximum safe operating speed are typically indicated by an area of the gauge marked in red, giving rise to the expression of "redlining" an engine — revving the engine up to the maximum safe limit. Most modern cars typically have a revolution limiter which electronically limits engine speed to prevent damage. Diesel engines with traditional mechanical injector systems have an integral governor which prevents over-speeding the engine, so the tachometers in vehicles and machinery fitted with such engines sometimes lack a redline.

In vehicles such as tractors and trucks, the tachometer often has other markings, usually a green arc showing the speed range in which the engine produces maximum torque, which is of prime interest to operators of such vehicles. Tractors fitted with a power take-off (PTO) system have tachometers showing the engine speed needed to rotate the PTO at the standardized speed required by most PTO-driven implements. In many countries, tractors are required to have a speedometer for use on a road. To save fitting a second dial, the vehicle's tachometer is often marked with a second scale in units of speed. This scale is only accurate in a certain gear, but since many tractors only have one gear that is practical for use on-road, this is sufficient. Tractors with multiple 'road gears' often have tachometers with more than one speed scale. Aircraft tachometers have a green arc showing the engine's designed cruising speed range.

In older vehicles, the tachometer is driven by the RMS voltage waves from the low tension (LT contact breaker) side of the ignition coil, while on others (and nearly all diesel engines, which have no ignition system) engine speed is determined by the frequency from the alternator tachometer output. This is from a special connection called an "AC tap" which is a connection to one of the stator's coil output, before the rectifier. Tachometers driven by a rotating cable from a drive unit fitted to the engine (usually on the camshaft) exist - usually on simple diesel-engined machinery with basic or no electrical systems. On recent EMS found on modern vehicles, the signal for the tachometer is usually generated from an ECU which derives the information from either the crankshaft or camshaft speed sensor.

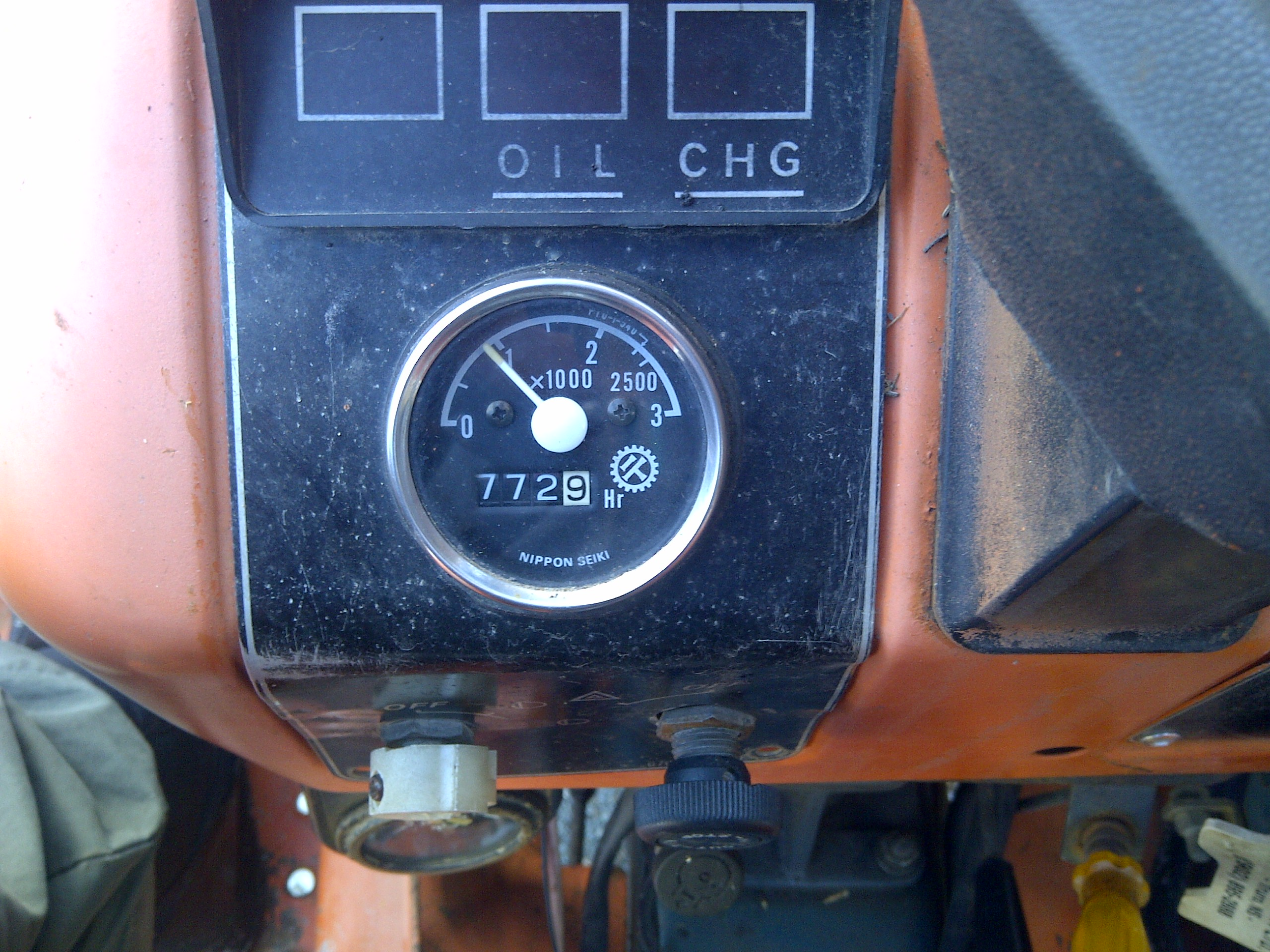
A tachometer on a tractor, reading up to 3000 RPM, with the hour meter below it showing 772.9 hours. The mark at 2500 RPM is the engine speed required to run the power take-off at 540 RPM.

=== Traffic engineering ===
Tachometers are used to estimate traffic speed and volume (flow). A vehicle is equipped with the sensor and conducts "tach runs" which record the traffic data. These data are a substitute or complement to loop detector data. To get statistically significant results requires a high number of runs, and bias is introduced by the time of day, day of week, and the season. However, because of the expense, spacing (a lower density of loop detectors diminishes data accuracy), and relatively low reliability of loop detectors (often 30% or more are out of service at any given time), tach runs remain a common practice.

== In trains and light-rail vehicles ==
Speed sensing devices, termed variously "wheel impulse generators" (WIG), pulse generators, speed probes, or tachometers are used extensively in rail vehicles. Common types include opto-isolator slotted disk sensors and Hall-effect sensors.

Hall-effect sensors typically use a rotating target attached to a wheel, gearbox or motor. This target may contain magnets, or it may be a toothed wheel. The teeth on the wheel vary the flux density of a magnet inside the sensor head. The probe is mounted with its head a precise distance from the target wheel and detects the teeth or magnets passing its face. One problem with this system is that the necessary air gap between the target wheel and the sensor allows ferrous dust from the vehicle's underframe to build up on the probe or target, inhibiting its function.

Opto-isolator sensors are completely encased to prevent ingress from the outside environment. The only exposed parts are a sealed plug connector and a drive fork, which is attached to a slotted disk internally through a bearing and seal. The slotted disk is typically sandwiched between two circuit boards containing a photo-diode, photo-transistor, amplifier, and filtering circuits which produce a square wave pulse train output customized to the customer's voltage and pulses per revolution requirements. These types of sensors typically provide 2 to 8 independent channels of output that can be sampled by other systems in the vehicle such as automatic train control systems and propulsion/braking controllers.

The sensors mounted around the circumference of the disk provide quadrature encoded outputs and thus allow the vehicle's computer to determine the direction of rotation of the wheel. This is a legal requirement in Switzerland to prevent rollback when starting from standstill. Strictly, such devices are not tachometers since they do not provide a direct reading of the rotational speed of the disk. The speed has to be derived externally by counting the number of pulses in a time period. It is difficult to prove conclusively that the vehicle is stationary, other than by waiting a certain time to ensure that no further pulses occur. This is one reason why there is often a time delay between the train stopping, as perceived by a passenger, and the doors being released. Slotted-disk devices are typical sensors used in odometer systems for rail vehicles, such as are required for train protection systems — notably the European Train Control System.

As well as speed sensing, these probes are often used to calculate distance travelled by multiplying wheel rotations by wheel circumference.

They can be used to automatically calibrate wheel diameter by comparing the number of rotations of each axle against a master wheel that has been measured manually. Since all wheels travel the same distance, the diameter of each wheel is proportional to its number of rotations compared to the master wheel. This calibration must be done while coasting at a fixed speed to eliminate the possibility of wheel slip/slide introducing errors into the calculation. Automatic calibration of this type is used to generate more accurate traction and braking signals, and to improve wheel slip detection.

A weakness of systems that rely on wheel rotation for tachometry and odometry is that the train wheels and the rails are very smooth and the friction between them is low, leading to high error rates if the wheels slip or slide. To compensate for this, secondary odometry inputs employ Doppler radar units beneath the train to measure speed independently.

== In analogue audio recording ==
In analogue audio recording, a tachometer is a device that measures the speed of audiotape as it passes across the head. On most audio tape recorders the tachometer (or simply "tach") is a relatively large spindle near the ERP head stack, isolated from the feed and take-up spindles by tension idlers.

On many recorders the tachometer spindle is connected by an axle to a rotating magnet that induces a changing magnetic field upon a Hall-effect transistor. Other systems connect the spindle to a stroboscope, which alternates light and dark upon a photodiode.

The tape recorder's drive electronics use signals from the tachometer to ensure that the tape is played at the proper speed. The signal is compared to a reference signal (either a quartz crystal or alternating current from the mains). The comparison of the two frequencies drives the speed of the tape transport. When the tach signal and the reference signal match, the tape transport is said to be "at speed." (To this day on film sets, the director calls "Roll sound!" and the sound man replies "Sound speed!" This is a vestige of the days when recording devices required several seconds to reach a regulated speed.)

Having perfectly regulated tape speed is important because the human ear is very sensitive to changes in pitch, particularly sudden ones, and without a self-regulating system to control the speed of tape across the head, the pitch could drift several percent. This effect is called a wow-and-flutter, and a modern, tachometer-regulated cassette deck has a wow-and-flutter of 0.07%.

Tachometers are acceptable for high-fidelity sound playback, but not for recording in synchronization with a movie camera. For such purposes, special recorders that record pilottone must be used.

Tachometer signals can be used to synchronize several tape machines together, but only if in addition to the tach signal, a directional signal is transmitted, to tell slave machines in which direction the master is moving.

== See also ==
- List of auto parts
- List of vehicle instruments
- Redline
- Tachograph
