= Audio system measurements =

Means of quantifying system performance

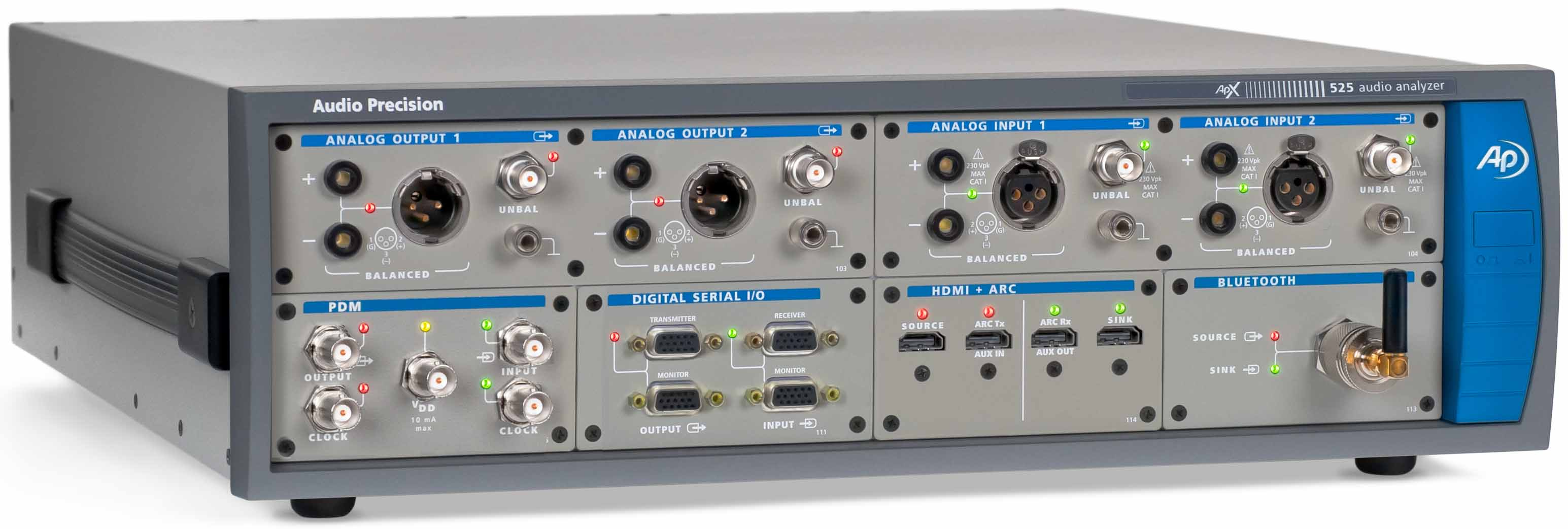
Audio analyzers, such as this APx525, can measure an audio system's performance characteristics quantitatively

Audio system measurements are used to quantify audio system performance. These measurements are made for several purposes. Designers take measurements to specify the performance of a piece of equipment. Maintenance engineers make them to ensure equipment is still working to specification, or to ensure that the cumulative defects of an audio path are within limits considered acceptable. Audio system measurements often accommodate psychoacoustic principles to measure the system in a way that relates to human hearing.

== Subjectivity and frequency weighting ==
Subjectively valid methods came to prominence in consumer audio in the UK and Europe in the 1970s, when the introduction of compact cassette tape, dbx and Dolby noise reduction techniques revealed the unsatisfactory nature of many basic engineering measurements. The specification of weighted CCIR-468 quasi-peak noise, and weighted quasi-peak wow and flutter became particularly widely used and attempts were made to find more valid methods for distortion measurement.

Measurements based on psychoacoustics, such as the measurement of noise, often use a weighting filter. It is well established that human hearing is more sensitive to some frequencies than others, as demonstrated by equal-loudness contours, but it is not well appreciated that these contours vary depending on the type of sound. The measured curves for pure tones, for instance, are different from those for random noise. The ear also responds less well to short bursts, below 100 to 200 ms, than to continuous sounds such that a quasi-peak detector has been found to give the most representative results when noise contains click or bursts, as is often the case for noise in digital systems. For these reasons, a set of subjectively valid measurement techniques have been devised and incorporated into BS, IEC, EBU and ITU standards. These methods of audio quality measurement are used by broadcast engineers throughout most of the world, as well as by some audio professionals, though the older A-weighting standard for continuous tones is still commonly used by others.

No single measurement can assess audio quality. Instead, engineers use a series of measurements to analyze various types of degradation that can reduce fidelity. Thus, when testing an analogue tape machine, it is necessary to test for wow and flutter and tape speed variations over longer periods, as well as for distortion and noise. When testing a digital system, testing for speed variations is normally considered unnecessary because of the accuracy of clocks in digital circuitry, but testing for aliasing and timing jitter is often desirable, as these have caused audible degradation in many systems.

Once subjectively valid methods have been shown to correlate well with listening tests over a wide range of conditions, then such methods are generally adopted as preferred. Standard engineering methods are not always sufficient when comparing like with like. One CD player, for example, might have higher measured noise than another CD player when measured with an RMS method, or even an A-weighted RMS method, yet sound quieter and measure lower when 468-weighting is used. This could be because it has more noise at high frequencies, or even at frequencies beyond 20 kHz, both of which are less important since human ears are less sensitive to them (see Noise shaping). This effect is how Dolby B works and why it was introduced. Cassette noise, which was predominantly high frequency and unavoidable given the small size and speed of the recorded track, could be made subjectively much less important. The noise sounded 10 dB quieter, but failed to measure much better unless 468-weighting was used rather than A-weighting.

== Measurable performance ==
=== Analog electrical ===
Frequency response
This measurement tells you over what frequency range output level for an audio component will remain reasonably constant (either within a specified decibel range or with reference to amplitude at 1 kHz). Preamplifiers may also contain equalizers for example to play LPs requiring RIAA frequency response correction, in which case the specification may describe how closely the response matches the standard. On the other hand, frequency range is a term sometimes used of loudspeakers and other transducers to indicate the frequencies that are usable, without necessarily specifying a decibel range. Power bandwidth is also related to frequency response – indicating the range of frequencies usable at high power.
A component having a flat frequency response will reproduce content at all frequencies across the specified frequency range at the same intensity. The frequency range often specified for audio components is between 20 Hz to 20 kHz, which broadly reflects the human hearing range. Well-designed solid-state amplifiers and CD players may have a frequency response that varies by only 0.2 dB between 20 Hz to 20 kHz. Loudspeakers tend to have considerably less flat frequency responses than this.

Total harmonic distortion (THD)
Music material contains distinct tones, and some types of distortion involve spurious tones at double or triple the frequencies of those tones. Such harmonically related distortion is called harmonic distortion. For high fidelity, this is usually expected to be <1% for electronic devices; mechanical elements such as loudspeakers usually have inescapable higher levels. Low distortion is relatively easy to achieve in electronics with use of negative feedback, but the use of high levels of feedback in this manner has been the topic of controversy among audiophiles. Essentially, all loudspeakers produce more distortion than electronics, and 1–5% distortion is not unheard of at moderately loud listening levels. Human ears are less sensitive to distortion in the low frequencies, and levels are usually expected to be under 10% at loud playback. Distortion that creates only even-order harmonics for a sine wave input is sometimes considered less intrusive than odd-order distortion.

Output power
Output power for amplifiers is ideally measured and quoted as maximum root mean square (RMS) power output per channel, at a specified distortion level at a particular load, which, by convention and government regulation, is considered the most meaningful measure of power available on music signals.
Power specifications require the load impedance to be specified, and in some cases, two figures will be given (for instance, the output power of a power amplifier for loudspeakers will be typically measured at 4 and 8 ohms).

Intermodulation distortion (IMD)
Distortion that is not harmonically related to the signal being amplified is intermodulation distortion. It is a measure of the level of spurious signals resulting from unwanted combination of different frequency input signals. This effect results from non-linearities in the system. Sufficiently high levels of negative feedback can reduce this effect in an amplifier. (Note: Many believe it is better to design electronics in a way to minimize feedback levels, though this is difficult to achieve while meeting other high-accuracy requirements.) Intermodulation in loudspeaker drivers is, as with harmonic distortion, almost always larger than in most electronics. IMD increases with cone excursion. Reducing a driver's bandwidth directly reduces IMD. This is achieved by splitting the desired frequency range into separate bands with an audio crossover and employing separate drivers for each band of frequencies. (Note: Steep slope crossover filters are most effective at IMD reduction, but may be too expensive to implement using high-current components and may introduce ringing distortion.) Intermodulation distortion in multi-driver loudspeaker systems can be greatly reduced with the use of active crossover, though it significantly increases system cost and complexity.

Noise
The level of unwanted noise generated by the system itself, or by interference from external sources added to the signal. Hum usually refers to noise only at power line frequencies (as opposed to e.g. broadband white noise), which is introduced through induction of power line signals into the inputs of gain stages, from inadequately regulated power supplies, or poor grounding of components.

Crosstalk
The introduction of noise (from another signal channel) caused by ground currents, stray inductance or capacitance between components or lines. Crosstalk reduces, sometimes noticeably, separation between channels (e.g., in a stereo system). A crosstalk measurement yields a figure in decibels relative to a nominal level of signal in the path receiving interference. Crosstalk is normally only a problem in equipment that processes multiple audio channels in the same chassis.

Common-mode rejection ratio (CMRR)
In balanced audio systems, there are equal and opposite signals in inputs, and any interference imposed on both leads will be subtracted, canceling out that interference. CMRR is a measure of a system's ability to ignore such interference and especially hum at its input. It is generally only significant with long lines on an input, or when some kinds of ground loop problems exist. Unbalanced inputs do not have common mode resistance; induced noise on their inputs appears directly as noise or hum.

Dynamic range and Signal-to-noise ratio (SNR)
SNR is the ratio between the maximum level a component can accommodate and the noise level it produces. Input noise is not counted in this measurement. Dynamic range refers to the ratio of maximum to minimum loudness in a given signal source (e.g., music or programme material), and this measurement also quantifies the maximum dynamic range an audio system can carry. The ratio is expressed in dB between the noise floor of the device and the maximum signal (usually a sine wave) that can be output at a specified (low) distortion level.
Since the early 1990s, it has been recommended by several authorities, including the Audio Engineering Society that measurements of dynamic range be made with an audio signal present. This avoids questionable measurements based on the use of blank media or muting circuits.
Signal-to-noise ratio (SNR), however, is the ratio between the noise floor and an arbitrary reference level or alignment level. In professional recording equipment, this reference level is usually +4 dBu per IEC 60268-17, though sometimes 0 dBu in UK and Europe, the EBU standard Alignment level. Test level, measurement level and line-up level mean different things, often leading to confusion. In consumer equipment, no official standard exists, though −10 dBV and −6 dBu are common.
Different media characteristically exhibit different amounts of noise and headroom. Though the values vary widely between units, a typical analogue cassette might give 60 dB, a vinyl record around 70 dB, a CD almost 100 dB. Most modern quality amplifiers have greater than 110 dB dynamic range, which approaches that of the human ear, usually taken as around 130 dB.

Phase distortion, Group delay, and Phase delay
A perfect audio component will maintain the phase coherency of a signal over the full range of frequencies. Phase distortion can be extremely difficult to reduce or eliminate. The human ear is largely insensitive to phase distortion, though it is exquisitely sensitive to relative phase relationships within heard sounds. The complex nature of our sensitivity to phase errors, coupled with the lack of a convenient test that delivers an easily understood quality rating, is the reason that it is not a part of conventional audio specifications. Multi-driver loudspeaker systems may have complex phase distortions, caused or corrected by crossovers, driver placement, and the phase behaviour of the specific driver.

Transient response
A system may have low distortion for a steady-state signal, but not on sudden transients. In amplifiers, this problem can be traced to power supplies in some instances, to insufficient high-frequency performance or to excessive negative feedback. Related measurements are slew rate and rise time. Distortion in transient response can be hard to measure. Many otherwise good power amplifier designs have been found to have inadequate slew rates, by modern standards. In loudspeakers, transient response performance is affected by the mass and resonances of drivers and enclosures and by group delay and phase delay introduced by crossover filtering or inadequate time alignment of the loudspeaker's drivers. Most loudspeakers generate significant amounts of transient distortion, though some designs are less prone to this (e.g., electrostatic loudspeakers, plasma arc tweeters, ribbon tweeters and horn enclosures with multiple entry points).

Damping factor
The ratio of the output impedance of an amplifier and connecting cables to the DC resistance of a voice coil. A higher number is generally believed to be better. This is a measure of how well a power amplifier controls the undesired motion of a loudspeaker driver. An amplifier must be able to suppress resonances caused by mechanical motion (e.g., inertia) of a speaker cone. This is especially important for a low-frequency driver with greater mass. For conventional loudspeaker drivers, this essentially involves ensuring that the output impedance of the amplifier is close to zero and that the speaker wires are sufficiently short and have sufficiently large diameter. A damping factor of 20 or greater is considered adequate for live sound reinforcement systems, as the SPL of inertia-related driver movement is 26 dB less than signal level and won't be heard. Negative feedback in an amplifier lowers its effective output impedance and thus increases its damping factor.

=== Mechanical ===
Wow and flutter
These measurements are related to physical motion in a component, largely the drive mechanism of analogue media, such as vinyl records and magnetic tape. Wow is a slow-speed (a few Hz) variation, caused by longer-term drift of the drive motor speed, whereas flutter is faster speed (a few tens of Hz) variations, usually caused by mechanical defects such as out-of-roundness of the capstan of a tape transport mechanism. The measurement is given in percent, and a lower number is better.

Rumble
The measure of the low frequency (many tens of Hz) noise contributed by the turntable of an analogue playback system. It is caused by imperfect bearings, uneven motor windings, vibrations in driving bands in some turntables, room vibrations (e.g., from traffic) that is transmitted by the turntable mounting and so to the phono cartridge.

=== Digital ===
Note that digital systems do not suffer from many of these analog effects at a signal level. As long as the digital symbols survive the transfer between components and can be perfectly regenerated (e.g., by pulse shaping techniques), the data itself is perfectly maintained. The data is typically buffered in a memory, and is clocked out by a very precise crystal oscillator. The data usually does not degenerate as it passes through many stages, because each stage regenerates new symbols for transmission.

Digital systems have their own problems. Digitizing adds quantization noise, which is measurable and depends on the audio bit depth of the system, regardless of other quality issues. Timing errors in sampling clocks (jitter) result in non-linear distortion (FM modulation) of the signal. One quality measurement for a digital system (bit error rate) relates to the probability of an error in transmission or reception. The bandwidth is determined by the sample rate. In general, digital systems are much less prone to error than analogue systems; However, nearly all digital systems have analogue inputs or outputs, and certainly all of those that interact with the analogue world do so. These analogue components of the digital system can suffer analogue effects and potentially compromise the integrity of a well-designed digital system.

Jitter
A measurement of the variation in period and absolute timing between measured clock versus an ideal clock. Jitter can raise the noise level in ADCs and DACs and, when severe, introduce errant spectral components, birdys.

Sample rate
A specification of the rate at which measurements are taken of the analogue signal. This is measured in samples per second, or hertz. A higher sampling rate allows a greater total bandwidth or pass-band frequency response and allows less-steep anti-aliasing filters to be used in the stop-band, which can in turn improve overall phase linearity in the pass-band.

Bit depth
In Pulse-code modulation audio, the bit depth is the number of bits of information in each sample. Quantization, a process used in digital audio sampling, creates an error in the reconstructed signal. The Signal-to-quantization-noise ratio is a function of the bit depth.

Audio CDs use a bit depth of 16-bits, while DVD-Video and Blu-ray discs can use 24-bit audio. The maximum dynamic range of a 16-bit system is about 96 dB, while for 24 bit it is about 144 dB.

To calculate the maximum theoretical dynamic range of a digital system (Signal-to-quantization-noise ratio, SQNR), use the following algorithm for bit depth Q:
$$\mathrm{SQNR} = 20 \log_{10}(2^Q) \approx 6.02 \cdot Q\ \mathrm{dB} \,\!$$

Example: A 16-bit system has 2^{16} different possibilities, from 0 – 65,535. The smallest signal is 1, so the number of different levels is one less, 2^{16} − 1. So for a 16-bit digital system, the dynamic range is 20·log(2^{16} − 1) ≈ 96 dB.

Dither can be used in audio mastering to randomize the quantization error, and some dither systems use noise shaping to move quantization noise to less audible areas of the audio frequency spectrum. The use of shaped dither can increase the effective dynamic range of 16-bit audio to around 120 dB.

Sample accuracy and synchronisation
Not as much a specification as an ability. Since independent digital audio devices are each run by their own crystal oscillator, and no two crystals are exactly the same, sample rate will be slightly different. Sample rate will also vary slightly over time, as crystals change in temperature, etc. These imperfections will cause the devices to drift apart over time. The effects of this can vary. If one digital device is used to monitor another digital device, this will cause dropouts or distortion in the audio, as one device will be producing more or less data than the other per unit time. If two independent devices record at the same time, one will lag the other more and more over time. This effect can be circumvented with a word clock synchronization. It can also be corrected in the digital domain using a drift correction algorithm. Such an algorithm compares the relative rates of two or more devices and uses sample-rate conversion to synchronize the streams. See also Clock recovery.

Linearity
Differential non-linearity and integral non-linearity are two measurements of the accuracy of an analog-to-digital converter. Basically, they measure how close the threshold levels for each bit are to the theoretical equally-spaced levels.

== Automated sequence testing ==
Sequence testing uses a specific sequence of test signals, for frequency response, noise, distortion, etc., generated and measured automatically to carry out a complete quality check on a piece of equipment or signal path. A single 32-second sequence was standardized by the EBU in 1985, incorporating 13 tones (40 Hz–15 kHz at −12 dB) for frequency response measurement, two tones for distortion (1024 and 60 Hz at +9 dB) plus crosstalk and compander tests. This sequence, which began with a 110-baud FSK signal for synchronizing purposes, also became CCITT standard O.33 in 1985.

Lindos Electronics expanded the concept, retaining the FSK concept, and inventing segmented sequence testing, which separated each test into a segment starting with an identifying character transmitted as 110-baud FSK so that these could be regarded as building blocks for a complete test suited to a particular situation. Regardless of the mix chosen, the FSK provides both identification and synchronization for each segment, so that sequence tests sent over networks and even satellite links are automatically responded to by measuring equipment. Thus, TUND represents a sequence made up of four segments which test the alignment level, frequency response, noise and distortion in less than a minute, with many other tests, such as wow and flutter, headroom, and crosstalk also available in alternate segments.

The Lindos sequence test system is now a de facto standard in broadcasting and many other areas of audio testing, with over 25 different segments recognized by Lindos test sets. The EBU standard is no longer used.

== Unquantifiable? ==
Many audio components are tested for performance using objective and quantifiable measurements, e.g., THD, dynamic range and frequency response. Some take the view that objective measurements are useful and often relate well to subjective performance, i.e., the sound quality as experienced by the listener. Floyd Toole has extensively evaluated loudspeakers in acoustical engineering research. In a peer reviewed scientific journal, Toole has presented findings that subjects have a range of abilities to distinguish good loudspeakers from bad, and that blind listening tests are more reliable than sighted tests. He found that subjects can more accurately perceive differences in speaker quality during monaural playback though a single loudspeaker, whereas subjective perception of stereophonic sound is more influenced by room effects. One of Toole's papers showed that objective measurements of loudspeaker performance match subjective evaluations in listening tests.

Some argue that because human hearing and perception are not fully understood, listener experience should be valued above everything else. This is often encountered in the world of home audio publications. The usefulness of blind listening tests and common objective performance measurements, e.g., THD, are questioned. For instance, crossover distortion at a given THD is much more audible than clipping distortion at the same THD, since the harmonics produced are at higher frequencies. This does not imply that the defect is somehow unquantifiable or unmeasurable; just that a single THD number is inadequate to specify it and must be interpreted with care. Taking THD measurements at different output levels would expose whether the distortion is clipping (which increases with level) or crossover (which decreases with level).

Whichever the view, some measurements have been historically favoured. For example, THD is an average of a number of harmonics equally weighted, even though research identifies that lower order harmonics are harder to hear at the same level, compared with higher-order ones. In addition, even-order harmonics are said to be generally harder to hear than odd order. A number of formulas that attempt to correlate THD with actual audibility have been published, however, none have gained mainstream use.

The mass market consumer magazine Stereophile promotes the claim that home audio enthusiasts prefer sighted tests than blind tests.

== See also ==
- ABX test
- Alignment level
- Amplitude distortion
- Audio noise measurement
- Audio equipment testing
- Audiophile
- Clipping (signal processing)
- Equal-loudness contour
- Flutter measurement
- Frequency response
- Headroom
- High fidelity
- Intermodulation distortion
- ITU-R 468 noise weighting
- Lindos Electronics
- Loudspeaker measurement
- Noise
- Perceptual Evaluation of Audio Quality (PEAQ)
- Phase distortion
- Physics of music
- Rumble measurement
- Signal-to-noise and distortion ratio (SINAD)
- Sound level meter
- Sound quality
- Total harmonic distortion (THD)
- Total harmonic distortion analyzer
- Weighting filter
- Wow and flutter measurement
