= MS-10 (disambiguation) =

MS-10 or variation, may refer to:

- Soyuz MS-10, was an aborted 2018 launch of the Soyuz spacecraft, the spacecraft, and the mission
- Progress MS-10, a Russian spacecraft, and unmanned space resupply mission
- Korg MS-10, an analog synthesizer
- Matra MS10, a Formula One car
- MiniSonic MS10, a professional audio test equipment from Lindos Electronics
- Mississippi Highway 10 (MS 10)

== See also ==
- Manuscript 10 (MS 10), several manuscripts; see List of illuminated manuscripts
- MS1 (disambiguation)
- MS (disambiguation)
- 10 (disambiguation)
