= Amplitude distortion =

Amplitude distortion is distortion occurring in a system, subsystem, or device when the output amplitude is not a linear function of the input amplitude under specified conditions.

Generally, output is a linear function of input only for a fixed portion of the transfer characteristics. In this region, I_{c}=βI_{b} where Ic is collector current and Ib is base current, following linear relation y=mx.

== Forms ==
When output is not in this portion, two forms of amplitude distortion might arise:

1. Harmonic distortion: The creation of harmonics of the fundamental frequency of a sine wave input to a system.
2. Intermodulation distortion: This form of distortion occurs when two sine waves of frequencies X and Y are present at the input, resulting in the creation of several other frequency components, whose frequencies include (X+Y), (X-Y), (2X-Y), (2Y-X), and generally (mX ± nY) for integer m and n. Generally the size of the unwanted output falls rapidly as m and n increase.

Due to the additional outputs, this form of distortion is definitely unwanted in audio, radio and telecommunication amplifiers, and it occurs for more than two waves as well.

In a narrowband system such as a radio communication system, unwanted outputs such as X-Y and 2X+Y will be remote from the wanted band and so be ignored by the system. In contrast, 2X-Y and 2Y-X will be close to the wanted signals. These so-called third order distortion products (third order as m+n = 3) tend to dominate the non-linear distortion of narrowband systems.

== Measurement ==
Amplitude distortion is measured with the system operating under steady-state conditions with a sinusoidal input signal. When other frequencies are present, the term "amplitude" refers to that of the fundamental only.

== See also ==
- Audio quality measurement
- Noise measurement
- Nonlinear system
- Headroom (audio signal processing)
