= DNL =

DNL, dnl, or similar, may refer to:

- dnL, variant of the soft drink 7 Up
- DNL or Deutsche Nachwuchsliga (the German Development League), is the elite junior league of the German Ice Hockey Federation
- Daniel Field, an airport in August (Georgia), according to IATA
- Day-Night Average Sound Level, a measure of average noise level over a day
- Denial eSports, a North American eSports organization.
- Det Norske Luftfartrederi, a Norwegian airline from 1918 to 1920.
- Det Norske Luftfartsselskap, one of the four Scandinavian airlines merged to produce Scandinavian Airlines System (SAS)
- Differential nonlinearity error, in electronics and digital signal processing
- North Dakota Democratic-NPL Party
- Dynamic Noise Limiter, a noise reduction system by Philips
- Discard to next line, a comment delimiter in the m4 computer language
- Do not load, a term sometimes used in Printed circuit board design to denote the omitting of a component
