= MS One =

MS One may refer to:

- Lockout (film), also called MS One: Maximum Security
- MySky MS One, an American light-sport aircraft design

== See also ==
- MS1 (disambiguation)
