= Anchor Point =

Anchor Point or anchor point may refer to:

- Anchor Point, Alaska, US
- Anchor Point, Newfoundland and Labrador, Canada
- Anchor point (audio)
