= Phase distortion =

Nonlinear phase response to filters

In signal processing, phase distortion or phase-frequency distortion is distortion, that is, change in the shape of the waveform, that occurs when (a) a filter's phase response is not linear over the frequency range of interest, that is, the phase shift introduced by a circuit or device is not directly proportional to frequency, or (b) the zero-frequency intercept of the phase-frequency characteristic is not 0 or an integral multiple of 2π radians.

== Audibility of phase distortion ==
Grossly changed phase relationships, without changing amplitudes, can be audible but the degree of audibility of the type of phase shifts expected from typical sound systems remains debated.

== See also ==
- Audio system measurements
- Phase noise
