= Head demagnetizer =

Cassette player maintenance tool

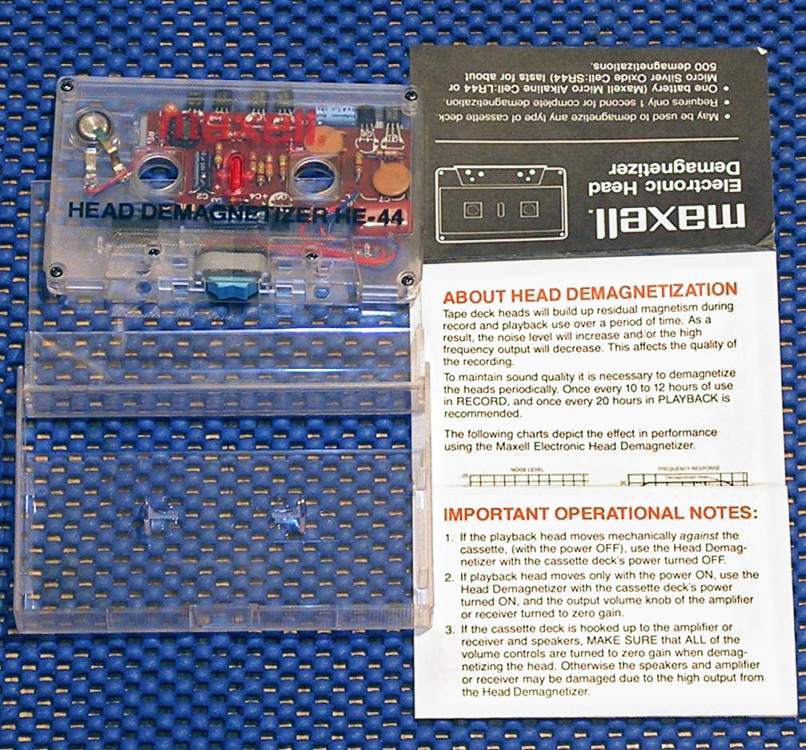
A Maxell HE-44 cassette type demagnetizer

A head demagnetizer is a device that removes the magnetic field that accumulates in the tape head of a tape deck whenever magnetic tape travels across the head.

The passage of magnetically charged tape over the metallic parts of the tape deck imparts a remnant magnetic field that can reduce fidelity in recording and playback. Demagnetizers (also called degaussers) neutralize this magnetization.

Demagnetizers of the wand type demagnetize anything that they are brought near, including tape heads and capstans. The wand's advantage lies in its demagnetizing other metal parts of the tape path, not just the heads. Used carelessly, it can increase the magnetization of the heads; if used too close to tapes, it can erase them. For cassette decks, demagnetizers of the cassette type resemble cassettes and contain circuitry to demagnetize tape heads. Both of these types of demagnetizer contain electronic circuitry and require a power source (either a battery or a power cord).

A third design consists of a cassette shell with a head cleaning tape wound on the spools and a magnetic disc mounted above the head cleaner tape. When the deck "plays" the cassette, the tape cleans the heads and simultaneously the magnet rotates, creating the alternating magnetic field required for demagnetizing.

Some cassette decks demagnetize themselves. These work by feeding the record head a high-frequency signal, whose amplitude is great at first and then is reduced to zero over a few seconds.
