= Dynamic Noise Limiter =

Sound processing technology

The Dynamic Noise Limiter, or DNL for short, is a noise reduction system introduced by Philips in the late 1960s to improve the quality of audio recordings on cassette tape. It is used on playback only, and does not require encoding the original audio signal. It was not widely used, as Dolby noise reduction became very popular. Third-party implementations called it Dynamic Noise Reduction, or DNR. As Dolby may be initialized DNR, there is some confusion between the two.

The small physical size of cassette tapes, compared to reel-to-reel tapes, means they must use a slow tape speed to allow practical recording times. Their smaller width also limits the dynamic range of the signal that can be recorded to it. This results in much higher amounts of audible tape hiss compared to reel-to-reel systems. Tape hiss occurs on all magnetic tape systems, as an ever-present low-volume, high-frequency signal. On reel-to-reel systems the higher dynamic range and faster tape speeds allowed the signal to be recorded at volume levels that overwhelm the hiss. On cassettes, there is simply not enough dynamic range to do this, especially in quiet passages, and the hiss becomes very audible.

DNL addresses this issue by noting that the hiss is only audible when the signal is low. At higher volumes, the low-volume hiss is simply not as obvious. Philips took advantage of this by having a circuit that would mute high-frequency signals only when the overall volume was low. Although this also muted any high-frequency components of the audio, the hiss would be masking these anyway. If the high-frequency components were high volume, they would overwhelm the hiss and the circuit would not mute it.

Philips released the circuit design royalty-free, which led to sample implementations being published in Wireless World in 1971 and Elektor in 1976 and 1984. DNL can be found e.g. in the 8000 cassette recorder series from BASF, which were sold in the 1970s. National Semiconductor further developed the process and offered it in the form of the IC LM1894.
