= Lindos Electronics =

Lindos Electronics is a British manufacturer of test equipment for audio quality measurement.

== History ==
Founded in 1979, by Peter J Skirrow, the business was named after the home where development and manufacture began, as is so often the case, in garage and spare rooms. Since then it has gone on to become a well-known name in audio and broadcasting, supplying test equipment to broadcasters and studios worldwide, and represented at many professional audio exhibitions.

The LA1 was the first product to be manufactured, and this was rapidly adopted by engineers at Independent Local Radio stations who needed quality testing equipment to ensure that their studios and transmitters met the IBA Code of Practice before they went on-air. It went on to be widely used by the BBC and other broadcasters and studios worldwide. Manufacture of the LA1 ceased with the introduction of the LA100 but it continues to be a sought-after product second hand.

The LA100, launched in 1984, introduced microprocessor controlled 'Sequence testing', with LCD graphic display. A policy of free software upgrades based on feedback from customers resulted in the LA100 becoming a well known and highly regarded product throughout the Broadcast and Professional Audio community. It continues to be manufactured in 2022 and is unusual in that all LA100 units ever made (some now 38 years old!) can still be upgraded to the latest design, even to the point of a 'style upgrade' which replaces the outdated brown and cream case and panel with modern silver and grey versions. In this sense it demonstrated an early approach to the principles of the Waste Electrical and Electronic Equipment Directive (WEEE) that took effect in Europe in 2006.

The MiniSonic MS10, introduced in 2005, is a small low-cost unit with many of the features of the LA100, including sequence testing.

The DigiSonic DS10 provides all the features of the MS10 and LA100 in a software package that runs in Windows on a PC. This requires a sound card, for testing in the analog domain.

The Lindos Test Sheet Database is a web-site that encourages users of Lindos test sets to upload their results for others to see. It is becoming a major source of independent results, for popular devices like the iPod as well as professional equipment.

Lindos Electronics is currently run by the son of the founder, Chris Skirrow, and in addition to making measuring equipment it also specialises in producing accurately calibrated low-cost omnidirectional electret microphones, as well as a low noise preamp and a selection of camera interfaces for both measurement and recording purposes.
