= Tape hiss =

High-frequency noise present on analogue magnetic tape recordings

Tape hiss is the high frequency noise present on analogue magnetic tape recordings caused by the size of the magnetic particles used to make the tape. Effectively, it is the noise floor of the recording medium. It can be reduced by the use of finer magnetic particles or by increasing the tape speed or the track width used by the recorder. A 3 dB improvement of the signal-to-noise ratio occurs for every doubling of the track width.

A number of noise reduction techniques can be used to reduce the impact of tape hiss, including Dolby NR and DBX, or, in the case of videotape recording, frequency modulation of either the composite video signal, or the luma component.

== See also ==
- Audio system measurements
- Barkhausen effect
- Sound recording and reproduction
