= Rumble (noise) =

Deep resonant sound

A rumble is a continuous deep, resonant sound, such as the sound made by heavy vehicles or thunder. In the context of audio reproduction rumble refers to a low frequency sound from the bearings inside a turntable. This is most noticeable in low quality turntables with ball bearings. Higher quality turntables use slide bearings, minimizing rumble.

Some phono pre-amplifiers implement a rumble filter, in an attempt to remove the noise. A heavier platter can also help dampen this.

Rumble measurement is carried out on turntables (for vinyl recordings) which tend to generate very low frequency noise originating from the centre bearing and from drive pulleys or belts, as well as from irregularities in the record disc itself.

It can be heard as low-frequency noise and becomes a serious problem when playing records on audio systems with a good low-frequency response. Even when not audible, rumble can cause intermodulation, modulating of the amplitude of other frequencies. The ‘unweighted’ response curve is intended for use in assessing the level of inaudible rumble with such intermodulation in mind.

== Turntable design ==

One way to reduce rumble is to make the turntable very heavy, so that it acts as mechanical damper or low-pass filter, but even with the best turntables a lot of rumble tends to be generated by warped records or pressing irregularities sometimes visible as ‘bobbles’ in the surface. An important factor affecting rumble is low-frequency resonance resulting from pickup arm mass bouncing against stylus compliance. This resonance is usually in the 10–30 Hz region, and will increase rumble as well as reducing tracking ability if not well-damped. Some pickup arms incorporate viscous damping aimed at eliminating such resonance.

== Rumble filters ==
Because these effects generate a mostly vertical component at the stylus, which corresponds to a difference signal in stereo reproduction, the incorporation of a high-pass filter operating only on the channel difference can be very effective in reducing rumble without loss of bass. Such a filter merges the two channels to mono at very low frequencies, which is not generally considered to have any effect on stereo perception, though it can change the sound balance (often for the better) by altering the way in which resonant room modes are stimulated (reducing corner to corner stimulation). The original circuit was designed in 1978 by Jeff Macaulay and featured as a circuit idea in Wireless World. Most so-called rumble filters work by simply rolling off the low-frequency response, which is detrimental to sound quality.

Though several standards exist that define how rumble should be measured, they all have a common basis, and use the weighting curves shown here. DIN 45539 (1971) and IEC98-1964 both cover rumble measurement. BS4852: Part 1 (1972) is specific in requiring that a slow rectifier be used, which shall reach 99% of its steady indication in 5s +-0.5s with not more than 10% overshoot.

== See also ==
- Audio system measurements
- Noise measurement
- Headroom
- Wow and flutter measurement
- Crosstalk measurement
- ITU-R 468 noise weighting
- A-weighting
- Weighting filter
- Equal-loudness contour
