= Headroom (audio signal processing) =

Amount by which a signal can exceed a designated nominal level

In digital and analog audio, headroom refers to the amount by which the signal-handling capabilities of an audio system can exceed a designated nominal level. Headroom can be thought of as a safety zone allowing transient audio peaks to exceed the nominal level without damaging the system or the audio signal, e.g., via clipping. Standards bodies differ in their recommendations for nominal level and headroom.

== Digital audio ==
In digital audio, headroom is defined as the amount by which digital full scale (FS) exceeds the nominal level in decibels (dB). The European Broadcasting Union (EBU) specifies several nominal levels and resulting headroom for different applications.

Application	Headroom
FM broadcasts	−9 dBFS
Digital broadcasts and ordinary digital recordings	−18 dBFS
Original master recordings	−24 dBFS

== Analog audio ==
In analog audio, headroom can mean low-level signal capabilities as well as the amount of extra power reserve available within the amplifiers that drive the loudspeakers.

== Alignment level ==
Alignment level is an anchor point 9 dB below the nominal level, a reference level that exists throughout the system or broadcast chain, though it may imply different voltage levels at different points in the analog chain. Typically, nominal (not alignment) level is 0 dB, corresponding to an analog sine wave of voltage of 1.23 volts RMS (+4 dBu or 3.47 volts peak to peak). In the digital realm, alignment level is −18 dBFS.

- AL = analog level
- SPL = sound pressure level

== See also ==
- A-weighting
- Audio system measurements
- Equal-loudness contour
- ITU-R 468 noise weighting
- Loudness war
- Noise measurement
- Rumble measurement
- Weighting filter
