= MS1 =

MS1 may refer to:

- FMA Ae. M.S.1, an air ambulance version of the 1932 Argentine FMA AeC.2 utility aircraft
- MS1, the first device in tandem mass spectrometry

MS-1 may refer to:

- Mercury-Scout 1, a 1961 satellite
- Mississippi's 1st congressional district
- Mississippi Highway 1
- Roland MS-1 Digital Sampler
- T-18 tank
- A type of Trams of Putilov plant
- MegaSquirt 'n Spark-Extra (MS1/Extra), a type of MegaSquirt electronic fuel injection controller
- MS-1 (wrestler), Mexican professional wrestler
- Metres per second, the SI unit of velocity, written as ms^{−1}
- A first year medical student
- MS-1 (spaceplane), a proposed US Spaceplane
