= Anchor point =

In audio and recording, what is known colloquially as an anchor point is a center position in a stereo mix reserved for only three or four important tracks. Most modern pop productions are anchored by lead (vocals and soloing instruments), bass, kick drum, and snare drum. These are usually within a few degrees of center (horizontal) and front (proximity or depth) in the mix. Exceptions include early stereo recordings using "stereo-switching" (a three-way switch allowing only left output, right output, or both) rather than pan pots) such as the Beatles's "Strawberry Fields Forever" and Jimi Hendrix's "Purple Haze". Examples of tracks using anchor points include The Breeders's "Cannonball", The Cure's "Catch", Lady Gaga's "Just Dance", Lily Allen's "The Fear", Radiohead's "Airbag", Squarepusher's "Star Time 2", Stone Roses' "One Love", and Weezer's "My Name Is Jonas".

== See also ==
- Alignment level
