= Wow (recording) =

Pitch variation in audio

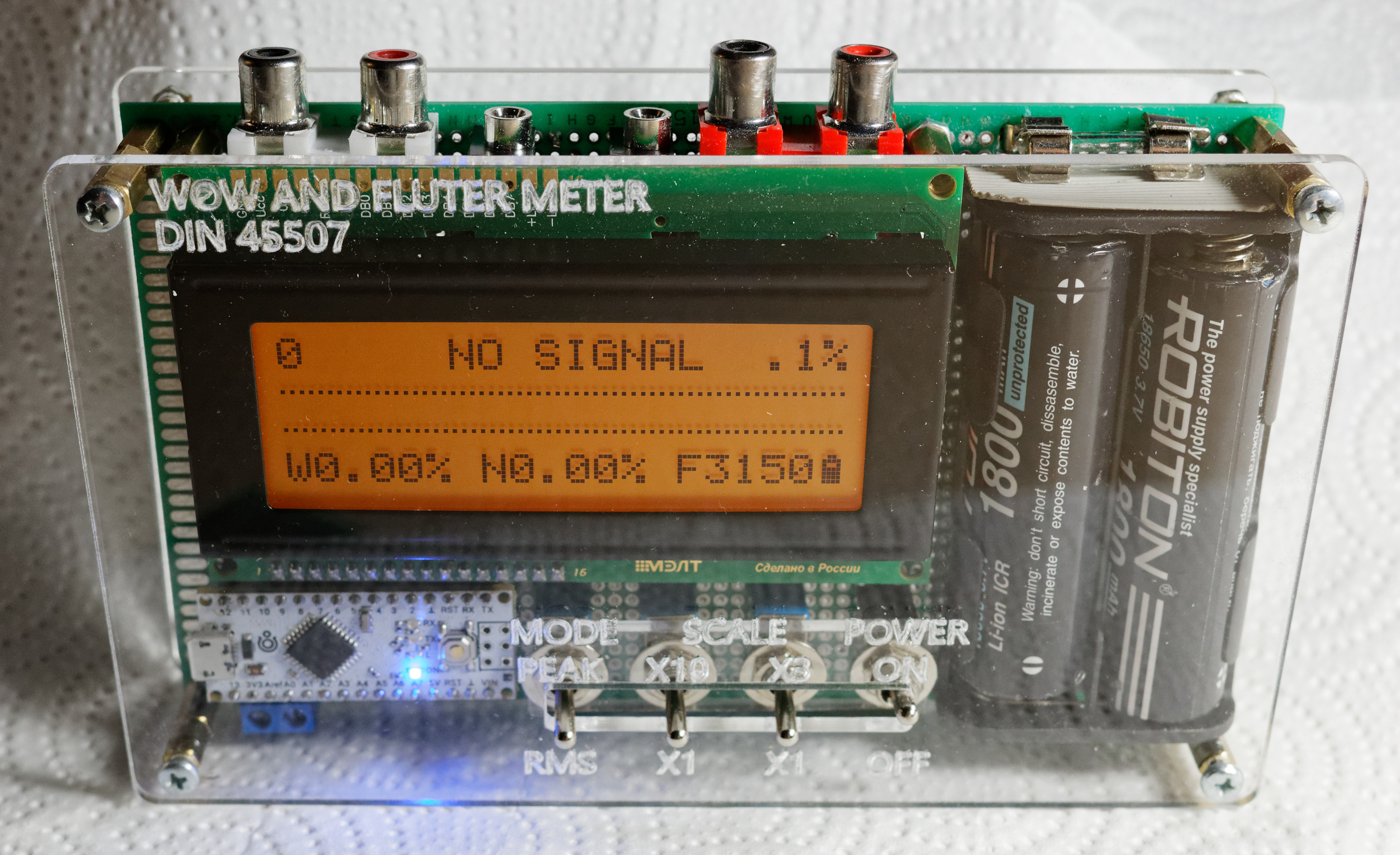
Wow and flutter meter

Wow is a relatively slow form of flutter (pitch variation) that can affect gramophone records and tape recorders. For both, the collective expression wow and flutter is commonly used.

== Gramophone records ==
When playing gramophone records, wow is a once-per-revolution pitch variation that could result from warping of the record or from a pressing plate that was not precisely centered.

If the grooves are not centered exactly relative to the spindle hole, the linear velocity of the stylus, instead of dropping gradually as the groove spirals towards the center, varies every revolution to be too high (resulting in a higher pitch) when the stylus is further out, and too low when the stylus is further inwards (resulting in a lower pitch). The more eccentric the positioning, the greater the pitch variation.

The cause for "wow"-effects on a warped disc is basically the same: a variation in the linear velocity of the stylus relative to the disc. This can be by either radial warping (similar to the eccentric hole case) or by the disc warping out of its plane. This would mean that the stylus would have to travel faster over the warped section as it must displace both in and out of the plane of the disc.

== Tape recorders ==
A similar problem can occur with tape recorders. The changes in frequency are caused by irregular tape motion during recording or playback. For example, a change in the angular velocity of the capstan, or dragging of the tape within a reel or audio cassette shell. The terms "wow and flutter" are often referred to together, flutter being a higher-rate version of wow.

Scrape flutter—a high-frequency flutter of above 1000 Hz—can sometimes occur from the tape vibrating as it passes over a head, as a result of rapidly interacting stretch in the tape and stiction at the head. It adds a roughness to the sound that is not typical of wow and flutter, and damping devices or heavy rollers are sometimes employed on professional tape machines to prevent it. Scrape flutter measurement requires special techniques, often using a 10 kHz tone.

A typical modern cassette recorder may have a wow and flutter specification of 0.08%.

== Video recording ==
A similar problem can also occur in videotape recordings, causing the picture to jitter slightly or the top of the picture to wobble. This is known as flagwaving.

== Correction ==
Methods of digital signal processing have been developed that correct wow and flutter by tracking various spurious things on the tape or film, which can be re-purposed as timing references. A system developed by Plangent Processes substantially reduces wow and flutter of very high rates to extremely low levels, with a substantial improvement in quality. The software Capstan by Celemony analyzes the already digitized musical material and uses varispeed playback to eliminate wow and flutter.

== See also ==
- Rumble measurement
- Phonograph
- Wow and flutter measurement
