= Flutter (electronics and communication) =

In electronics and communication, flutter is the rapid variation of signal parameters, such as amplitude, phase, and frequency. Examples of electronic flutter are:

- Rapid variations in received signal levels, such as variations that may be caused by atmospheric disturbances, antenna movements in a high wind, or interaction with other signals.
- In radio propagation, a phenomenon in which nearly all radio signals that are usually reflected by ionospheric layers in or above the E-region experience partial or complete absorption.
- In radio transmission, rapidly changing signal levels, together with variable multipath time delays, caused by reflection and possible partial absorption of the signal by aircraft flying through the radio beam or common scatter volume.
- The variation in the transmission characteristics of a loaded telephone line caused by the action of telegraph direct currents on the loading coils.
- In recording and reproducing equipment, the deviation of frequency caused by irregular mechanical motion, e.g., that of capstan angular velocity in a tape transport mechanism, during operation.

== See also ==
Electronic Flutter

- Wow (recording)
- Wow and flutter measurement
