= Tape transport =

Mechanism that guides tape through a device

Tape transport with dual pinch rollers - Technics RS-1520

A tape transport is the collection of parts of a magnetic tape player or recorder that move the tape and play or record it. Transport parts include the head, capstan, pinch roller, tape pins, and tape guide. The tape transport as a whole is called the transport mechanism.

== Tape head ==
The tape head is the part of a tape recording or playback device which converts the magnetic fluctuations present in the tape into an electrical signal, which is then amplified and sent to speakers or headphones. The tape head is set off-center in a multitrack device in order to record or play one or more tracks running in each direction of the tape (e.g. the two different tracks present on most, if not all, compact cassettes).

== Capstan ==
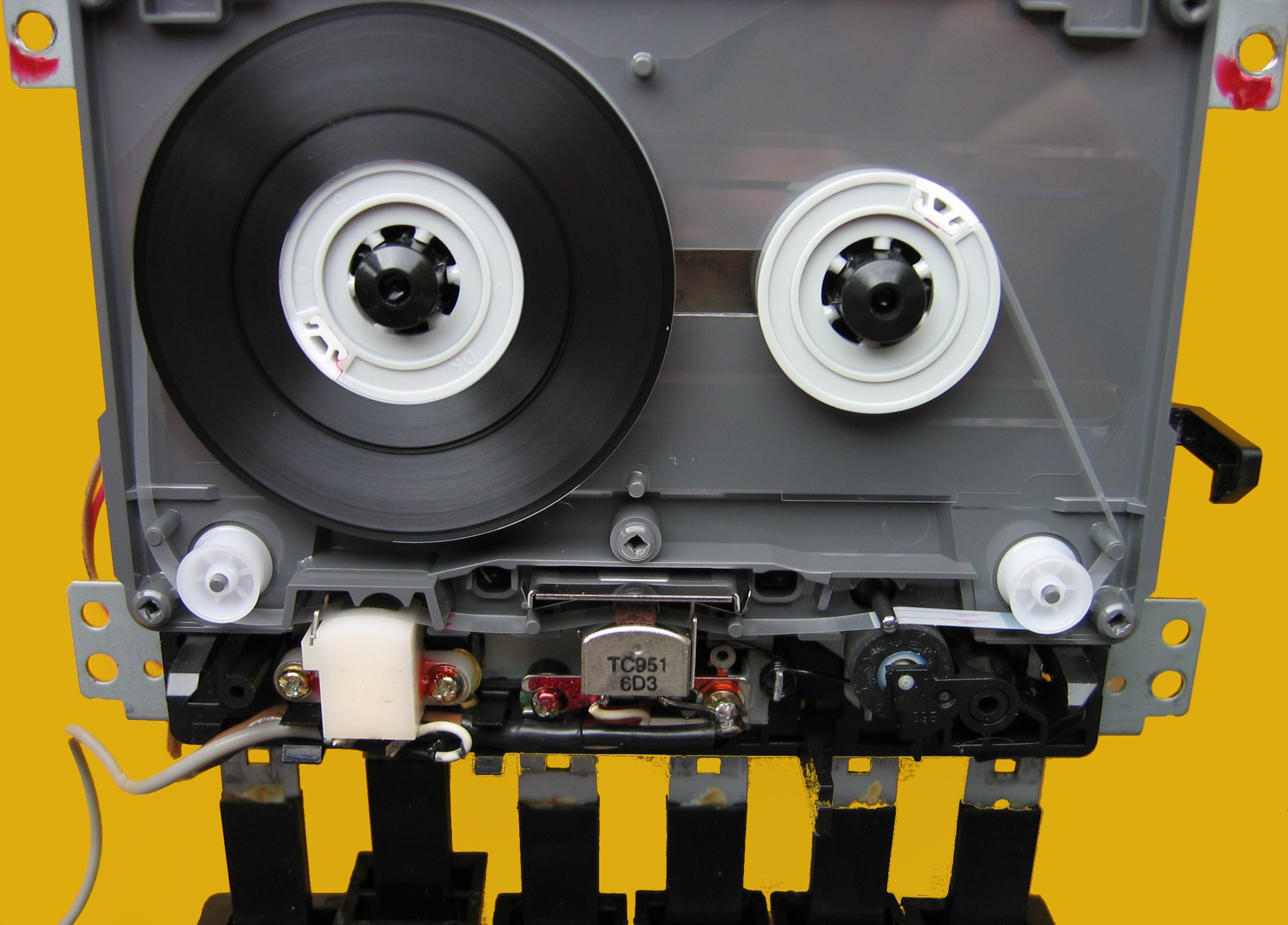
Threaded tape of an open Compact Cassette in the tape drive

The capstan is a rotating spindle used to move recording tape through the mechanism of a tape recorder. The tape is threaded between the capstan and one or more rubber-covered wheels, called pinch rollers, which press against the capstan, thus providing friction necessary for the capstan to pull the tape. The capstan is always placed downstream (in the direction of tape motion) from the tape heads. To maintain the required tension against the tape heads and other part of the tape transport, a small amount of drag is placed on the supply reel. Tape recorder capstans have a function similar to nautical capstans, which however have no pinch rollers, the line simply being wound around them.

The use of a capstan allows the tape to run at a precise and constant speed. Capstans are precision-machined spindles, and polished very smooth: any out-of-roundness or imperfections can cause uneven motion and an audible effect called flutter. The alternative to capstan drive, simply driving the tape takeup reel (which was used on some cheap tape recorders), causes problems both with the speed difference between a full and empty reel and with speed variations as described.

Dual capstans, where one is on each side of the heads, are claimed to provide even smoother tape travel across the heads and result in less variance in the recorded/playback signal.

== Pinch roller ==
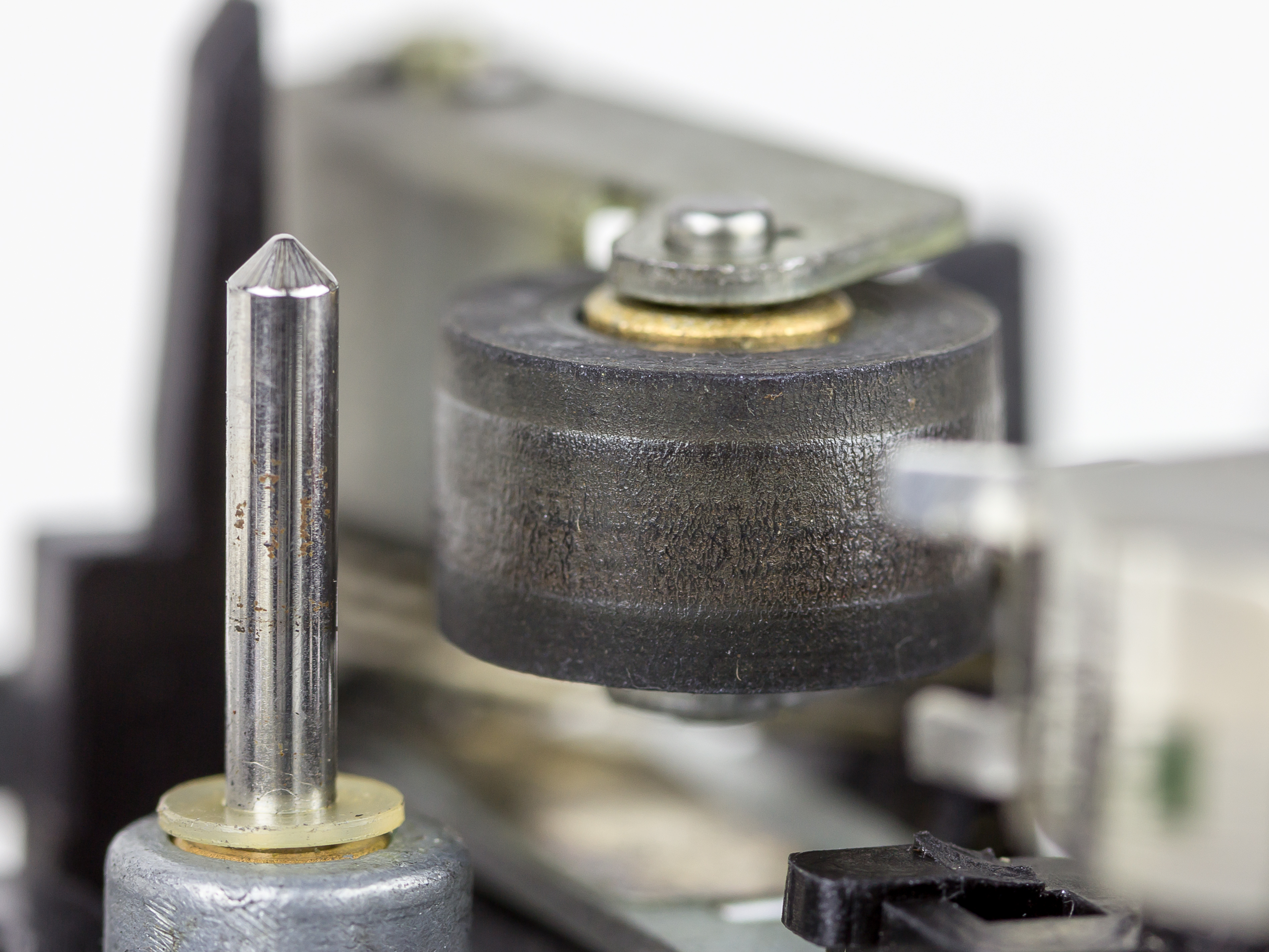
Capstan and pinch roller

The pinch roller is a rubberized, free-spinning wheel typically used to press magnetic tape against a capstan shaft in order to create friction necessary to drive the tape along the magnetic heads (erase, write, read).

Most magnetic tape recorders use one capstan motor and one pinch roller located after the magnetic heads in the direction of the moving tape. However, multiple pinch rollers may also be employed in association with one or more capstans. An example of the application of multiple pinch rollers is the Technics RS-1520 tape recorder, which utilizes two pinch rollers located on opposite sides of a single capstan shaft, providing a more stable transport across two sets of magnetic heads. Dual pinch rollers are also used (along with dual capstans) in auto-reverse cassette decks to drive the tape in both directions as needed. In this case, only one pinch roller is pressed against its corresponding capstan at a time.

== Tension arm ==
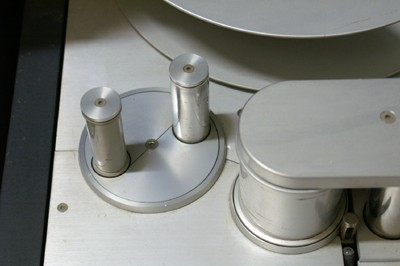
Left tension arm on Studer A-80 tape recorder

A tension arm is a device used in magnetic tape recorders/reproducers to control the tension of the magnetic tape during machine operation. The recorders equipped with a tension arm can utilize more than one of them to control tape tension in different direction of winding or during different modes of tape operation. Tension arms can also be found on digital data recorders and other types of recorders/reproducers using continuous tape media such as magnetic digital tape, perforated paper tape, and analog magnetic tape.
