= Noise weighting =

A noise weighting is a specific amplitude-vs.-frequency characteristic that is designed to allow subjectively valid measurement of noise. It emphasises the parts of the spectrum that are most important.

Usually, noise means audible noise, in audio systems, broadcast systems or telephone circuits. In this case the weighting is sometimes referred to as Psophometric weighting, though this term is best avoided because, although strictly a general term, the word Psophometric is sometimes assumed to refer to a particular weighting used in telecommunications.

A major use of noise weighting is in the measurement of residual noise in audio equipment, usually present as hiss or hum in quiet moments of programme material. The purpose of weighting here is to emphasise the parts of the audible spectrum that our ears perceive most readily, and attenuate the parts that contribute less to our perception of loudness, in order to get a measured figure that correlates well with subjective effect.

The ITU-R 468 noise weighting was devised specifically for this purpose, and is widely used in broadcasting, especially in the UK and Europe. A-weighting is also used, especially in the United States, though this is only really valid for the measurement of tones, not noise, and is widely incorporated into sound level meters.

In telecommunications, noise weightings are used by agencies concerned with public telephone service, and various standard curves are based on the characteristics of specific commercial telephone instruments, representing successive stages of technological development. The coding of commercial apparatus appears in the nomenclature of certain weightings. The same weighting nomenclature and units are used in military versions of commercial noise measuring sets.

Telecommunication measurements are made in lines terminated either by the measuring set or an instrument of the relevant class.

== See also ==
- A-weighting
- ITU-R 468 noise weighting
- Equal-loudness contour
- Noise pollution
- Weighting filter
- Psophometric weighting
