= Robinson–Dadson curves =

Equal-loudness contours for the human ear

The Robinson–Dadson curves are one of many sets of equal-loudness contours for the human ear, determined experimentally by D. W. Robinson and R. S. Dadson.

Until recently, it was common to see the term Fletcher–Munson used to refer to equal-loudness contours generally, even though the re-determination carried out by Robinson and Dadson in 1956, became the basis for an ISO standard ISO 226 which was only revised recently.

It is now better to use the term equal-loudness contours as the generic term, especially as a recent survey by ISO redefined the curves in a new standard, ISO 226:2003.

According to the ISO report, the Robinson-Dadson results were the odd one out, differing more from the current standard than did the Fletcher–Munson curves. It comments that it is fortunate that the 40-Phon Fletcher-Munson curve on which the A-weighting standard was based turns out to have been in good agreement with modern determinations.

The article also comments on the large differences apparent in the low-frequency region, which remain unexplained. Possible explanations are:

- The equipment used was not properly calibrated.
- The criteria used for judging equal loudness (which is tricky) differed.
- Different races actually vary greatly in this respect (possible, and most recent determinations were by the Japanese).
- Subjects were not properly rested for days in advance or were exposed to loud noise in travelling to the tests which tensed the tensor timpani and stapedius muscles controlling low-frequency mechanical coupling.

== See also ==
- A-weighting
- ITU-R 468 noise weighting
