= Received noise power =

In telecommunications, received noise power is a measure of noise in a receiver. For example, the received noise power might be:

1. The calculated or measured noise power, within the bandwidth being used, at the receive end of a circuit, channel, link, or system.
2. The absolute power of the noise measured or calculated at a receive point. The related bandwidth and the noise weighting must also be specified.
3. The value of noise power, from all sources, measured at the line terminals of a telephone set's receiver.' Either flat weighting or some other specific amplitude-frequency characteristic or noise weighting characteristic must be associated with the measurement.

This article incorporates public domain material from Federal Standard 1037C. General Services Administration. Archived from the original on 2022-01-22. (in support of MIL-STD-188).
