= Threshold of pain =

Point at which pain begins to be felt

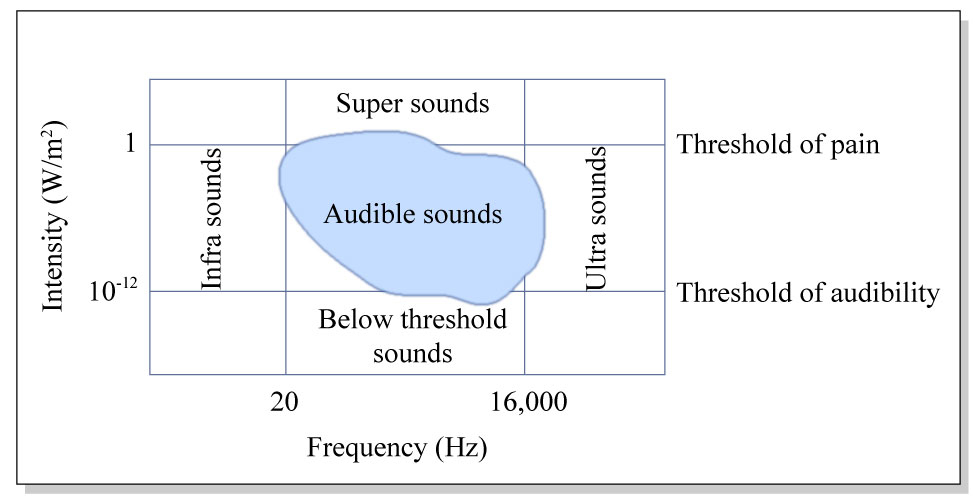
Audible sounds need to be in a certain range of both intensity and frequency.

The threshold of pain or pain threshold is the point along a curve of increasing perception of a stimulus at which pain begins to be felt. It is an entirely subjective phenomenon. A distinction must be maintained between the stimulus (an external thing that can be directly measured, such as with a thermometer) and the person's or animal's resulting pain perception (an internal, subjective thing that can sometimes be measured indirectly, such as with a visual analog scale). Although an IASP document defines "pain threshold" as "the minimum intensity of a stimulus that is perceived as painful", it then goes on to say (contradictorily in letter although not in spirit) that:

Traditionally the threshold has often been defined, as we defined it formerly, as the least stimulus intensity at which a subject perceives pain. Properly defined, the threshold is really the experience of the patient, whereas the intensity measured is an external event. It has been common usage for most pain research workers to define the threshold in terms of the stimulus, and that should be avoided ... The stimulus is not pain (q.v.) and cannot be a measure of pain.

Although the phrasing may not convey it perfectly, the distinction clearly meant is the aforementioned one between the stimulus and the perception of it. The intensity at which a stimulus (e.g., heat, pressure) begins to evoke pain is thus called by a separate term, threshold intensity. So, if a hotplate on a person's skin begins to hurt at 42 °C (107 °F), that is the pain threshold temperature for that bit of skin at that time. It is not the pain threshold (which is internal/subjective) but the temperature at which the pain threshold was crossed (which is external/objective).

The intensity at which a stimulus begins to evoke pain varies from individual to individual and for a given individual over time. Genetic and physiological factors contribute to these measured differences. Drugs are also a common medical approach to alter pain sensitivity.

== Heat ==
The temperature at which heat becomes painful for a recipient is called the heat pain threshold for that person at that time. One study showed that morning-oriented people have higher pain threshold for heat as compared to evening-oriented individuals.

== Hearing ==
The pressure at which sound becomes painful for a listener is the pain threshold pressure for that person at that time. The threshold pressure for sound varies with frequency and can be age-dependent. People who have been exposed to more noise/music usually have a higher threshold pressure. Threshold shift can also cause threshold pressure to vary. Prolonged exposure to sound at levels evoking pain can cause physical damage, potentially leading to hearing impairment and tinnitus.

The volume in acoustics refers to loudness. It is a common term for the amplitude of sound or the sound pressure level. Different values for pain threshold pressure level and pain threshold pressure are found in the literature:

Threshold of Pain
Sound pressure level	Sound pressure
120 dBSPL	20 Pa
130 dBSPL	63 Pa
134 dBSPL	100 Pa
137.5 dBSPL	150 Pa
140 dBSPL	200 Pa

== Differences in pain threshold ==
Even when two individuals experience the same trauma or disease, each individual may report a different perceived level of pain from the other, suggesting that each person has a different sensitivity and threshold to pain. This difference in threshold also does not behave collectively for all types of pain. One person may be more sensitive to a high-temperature stimulus but less sensitive to low temperatures compared to another individual.

Evidence suggests that pain thresholds are, to a degree, inheritable. Different forms of pain express various proportions of sensitivity to pain that can be attributed to shared genetics between individuals.

== Changes to pain threshold ==
For the same individual, various external factors may cause an increase or decrease in pain threshold.

=== Nociceptors ===
The perception of pain is triggered by the activation of special neuron cells known as nociceptors. When trauma occurs, nociceptors transmit electric signals to the central nervous system (CNS) and pain is perceived. These signals are characterized by action potentials, which depolarize and repolarize the nociceptor membrane through Na+ and K+ channels. An external stimulus causes the resting membrane potential to rise until a particular threshold triggers the action potential.

There are various categories of nociceptors that each play different roles in perception of pain. Some of these classifications are known as C-fibers and A-fibers. C-fibers are unmyelinated, have smaller diameters, and conduct signals more slowly. A-fibers generally have thicker myelination, larger diameters, and higher signal conduction velocity. Each of these fibers is associated with different types of pain. A-fibers generally correlate with short, intense bursts of pain, while C-fibers attribute to longer-lasting pain.

Different regions of the body have lower or higher thresholds for pain activation, which is linked to the quantity and category of nociceptors. For example, rotating forces activate nociceptors that are localized to joints more easily, while cutting forces will easily trigger skin-localized nociceptors.

Nociceptor activity can be sensitized or desensitized, causing increased or decreased excitability, respectively. This causes the pain threshold to rise or lower in response to stimulus. One example is Mechanically Insensitive Afferents (MIA), which do not appear to respond to painful stimulus unless tissue has been injured.

=== Clinical ===
Visual depiction of the electric current needed to trigger action potentials in normal and CIP patients. Also includes tests on nociceptors modified by CRISPR to either treat or replicate CIP characteristics. (This image was edited from the listed source)

Some patients exhibit a congenital insensitivity to pain (CIT). This genetic variation can be traced to nociceptors. One particular clinical experiment utilizes induced pluripotent stem cells (IPSCs) from both healthy and CIT patients to measure nociceptor activity. Results demonstrated that a greater electrical current was required to activate action potentials in CIT patients than in healthy patients. A separate experiment demonstrated a different mutation which inversely caused hyperexcitability in nociceptors, meaning that a lower-than-normal stimulus passed the threshold to trigger action potentials.

Another clinical example reports patients with inherited erythromelalgia (IEM) experiencing extreme pain because of a particular gain-of-function mutation in a nociceptor Na+ channel. This increased Na+ channel activity caused hyperexcitable action potentials, resulting in a lowered pain threshold. A separate case with two IEM patients that had this identical Na+ channel reported one patient perceiving less pain. That specific patient also had a gain-of-function mutation in a related K+ channel, which reduced nociceptor excitability.

==== Therapeutic Treatment ====
Research suggests that altering the action potential characteristics of nociceptors can be used to treat various types of pain. Some data shows, for example, that activating specific K+ channels can reduce hyperalgesia. Overall, however, treating pain by targeting nociceptors is currently limited due to their complexity and variety.

=== Opioids ===
The body has its own system to produce endogenous opioids, which are used to regulate pain perception. Nociceptor stimulation increases the release of these compounds.

Exogenous opioids like morphine and fentanyl have become common medical applications to treat debilitating pain.

== Measurement ==
Microneurography can be used to measure nerve activity when a subject is still awake. This can be used to observe electrical responses in nociceptors when a painful stimulus occurs.

The Visual Analog Scale (VAS) is often used clinically to report patients' level of pain that they are experiencing.

== See also ==
- Absolute threshold of hearing
- Dolorimeter – an instrument used to measure pain threshold
- Exposure action value
- Limen – threshold of perception
- Phon
- Sone
- Weber–Fechner law, regarding the difference between stimulus and sensation
- Weighting curve and A-weighting regarding dB(A)
