= Noise measurement =

Measurement of environmental noise

In acoustics, noise measurement can be for the purpose of measuring environmental noise or measuring noise in the workplace. Applications include monitoring of construction sites, aircraft noise, road traffic noise, entertainment venues and neighborhood noise. One of the definitions of noise covers all "unwanted sounds". When sound levels reach a high enough intensity, the sound, whether it is wanted or unwanted, may be damaging to hearing. Environmental noise monitoring is the measurement of noise in an outdoor environment caused by transport (e.g. motor vehicles, aircraft, and trains), industry (e.g. machines) and recreational activities (e.g. music). The laws and limits governing environmental noise monitoring differ from country to country.

At the very least, noise may be annoying or displeasing or may disrupt the activity or balance of human or animal life, increasing levels of aggression, hypertension and stress. In the extreme, excessive levels or periods of noise can have long-term negative health effects such as hearing loss, tinnitus, sleep disturbances, a rise in blood pressure, an increase in stress and vasoconstriction, and an increased incidence of coronary artery disease. In animals, noise can increase the risk of death by altering predator or prey detection and avoidance, interfering with reproduction and navigation, and contributing to permanent tinnitus and hearing loss.

Various interventions are available to combat environmental noise. Roadway noise can be reduced by the use of noise barriers, limitation of vehicle speeds, alteration of roadway surface texture, limitation of heavy vehicles, use of traffic controls that smooth vehicle flow to reduce braking and acceleration, and tire design. Aircraft noise can be reduced by using quieter jet engines, altering flight paths and considering the time of day to benefit residents near airports. Industrial noise is addressed by redesign of industrial equipment, shock mounted assemblies and physical barriers in the workplace.

Noise may be measured using a sound level meter at the source of the noise. Alternatively, an organization or company may measure a person's exposure to environmental noise in a workplace via a noise dosimeter. The measurements taken using either of these methods will be evaluated according to the standards below.

== Audio Systems and Broadcasting ==
Noise measurement can also be part of a test procedure using white noise, or some other specialized form of test signal. In audio systems and broadcasting, specific methods are used to obtain subjectively valid results in order that different devices and signal paths may be compared regardless of the inconsistent spectral distribution and temporal properties of the noise that they generate. In particular, the ITU-R 468 noise weighting was devised specifically for this purpose and is widely used for professional audio and broadcast measurements.

== Standards ==
There are a number of standards for noise measurement, each with a different goal or focus, including:

- Standard:ITU-R BS 468 widely used in Broadcasting and professional Audio.
- Standard:IEC A-weighting is widely used in Environmental Noise measurement.
- Standard:CCIR recommendation 468-4 is now maintained as ITU-R BS 468
- Standard:CCITT 0.41 refers to 'Psophometric weighting' used on telephone circuits.
- Standard:CCITT P53 is now continued as CCITT0.41
- Standard:BS 6402:1983 specifies Personal sound exposure meters.
- Standard:BS 3539:1968 specifies Sound level meters for motor vehicle noise.
- Standard:BSEN 60651 supersedes BS 5969:1981 Sound level meters

== See also ==
- Sound power level L_{WA}
- Audio system measurements
- Rumble measurement
- Noise (environmental)
- Noise pollution
- Noise music
- Noise dosimeter
- Equal-loudness contour
- A-weighting
- C-weighting
- Weighting filter
