= Sone =

Unit of perceived loudness

The sone (/ˈsoʊn/) is a unit of loudness, the subjective perception of sound pressure. The study of perceived loudness is included in the topic of psychoacoustics and employs methods of psychophysics. Doubling the perceived loudness doubles the sone value. Proposed by Stanley Smith Stevens in 1936, it is not an SI unit.

== Definition and conversions ==
According to Stevens' definition, a loudness of 1 sone is equivalent to 40 phons (a 1 kHz tone at 40 dB SPL). The phons scale aligns with dB, not with loudness, so the sone and phon scales are not proportional. Rather, the loudness in sones is, at least very nearly, a power law function of the signal intensity, with an exponent of 0.3. With this exponent, each 10 phon increase (or 10 dB at 1 kHz) produces almost exactly a doubling of the loudness in sones.

sone	1	2	4	8	16	32	64
phon	40	50	60	70	80	90	100

At frequencies other than 1 kHz, the loudness level in phons is calibrated according to the frequency response of human hearing, via a set of equal-loudness contours, and then the loudness level in phons is mapped to loudness in sones via the same power law.

Loudness N in sones (for L_{N} > 40 phon):

$$N = \left(10^{\frac{L_N-40}{10}}\right)^{0.30103} \approx 2^{\frac{L_N-40}{10}}$$

or loudness level L_{N} in phons (for N > 1 sone):

$$L_N = 40 + 10 \log_{2}(N)$$

Corrections are needed at lower levels, near the threshold of hearing.

These formulas are for single-frequency sine waves or narrowband signals. For multi-component or broadband signals, a more elaborate loudness model is required, accounting for critical bands.

To be fully precise, a measurement in sones must be specified in terms of the optional suffix G, which means that the loudness value is calculated from frequency groups, and by one of the two suffixes D (for direct field or free field) or R (for room field or diffuse field).

== Example values ==
Description	Sound pressure	Sound pressure level	Loudness
	pascal	dB re 20 μPa	sone
Threshold of pain	~ 100	~ 134	~ 676
Hearing damage during short-term effect	~ 20	~ 120	~ 256
Jet, 100 m away	6 ... 200	110 ... 140	128 ... 1024
Jackhammer, 1 m away / nightclub	~ 2	~ 100	~ 64
Hearing damage during long-term effect	~ 6×10^{−1}	~ 90	~ 32
Major road, 10 m away	2×10^{−1} ... 6×10^{−1}	80 ... 90	16 ... 32
Passenger car, 10 m away	2×10^{−2} ... 2×10^{−1}	60 ... 80	4 ... 16
TV set at home level, 1 m away	~ 2×10^{−2}	~ 60	~ 4
Normal talking, 1 m away	2×10^{−3} ... 2×10^{−2}	40 ... 60	1 ... 4
Very calm room	2×10^{−4} ... 6×10^{−4}	20 ... 30	0.15 ... 0.4
Rustling leaves, calm breathing	~ 6×10^{−5}	~ 10	~ 0.02
Auditory threshold at 1 kHz	2×10^{−5}	0	0

== See also ==
- A-weighting
- LKFS
- Stevens's power law
- Weber–Fechner law
