= DBrn =

Abbreviation for decibels above reference noise

The symbol dBrn or dB(rn) is an abbreviation for decibels above reference noise.

Weighted noise power in dB is referred to 1.0 picowatt. Thus, 0 dBrn = -90 dBm. Use of 144 line, 144-receiver, or C-message weighting, or flat weighting, can be indicated in parentheses.

With C-message weighting, a one-milliwatt, 1000 Hz tone will read +90 dBrn, but the same power as white noise, randomly distributed over a 3 kHz band will read approximately +88.5 dBrn, because of the frequency weighting.

With 144 weightings, a one milliwatt, 1000 Hz white noise tone will also read +90 dBrn, but the same 3 kHz power will only read +82 dBrn, because of the different frequency weighting.

Note: In telecommunications, dBrn adjusted also called dBa denotes "decibels adjusted", i.e. weighted absolute noise power. This is totally unrelated to and not a synonym for dB(A).
