= Weighting filter =

Filter used to emphasize or suppress aspects in measurements

A weighting filter is used to emphasize or suppress some aspects of a phenomenon compared to others, for measurement or other purposes.

== Audio applications ==
In each field of audio measurement, special units are used to indicate a weighted measurement as opposed to a basic physical measurement of energy level. For sound, the unit is the phon (1 kHz equivalent level).

=== Sound ===
Sound has three basic components, the wavelength, frequency, and speed. In sound measurement, we measure the loudness of the sound in decibels (dB). Decibels are logarithmic with 0 dB as the reference. There are also a range of frequencies that sounds can have. Frequency is the number of times a sine wave repeats itself in a second. Normal auditory systems can usually hear between 20 and 20,000 Hz. When we measure sound, the measurement instrument takes the incoming auditory signal and analyzes it for these different features. Weighting filters in these instruments then filter out certain frequencies and decibel levels depending on the filter. A weighted filters are most similar to natural human hearing. This allows the sound level meter to determine what decibel level the incoming sound would likely be for a normal hearing human's auditory system.

=== Loudness measurements ===
In the measurement of loudness, for example, an A-weighting filter is commonly used to emphasize frequencies around 3–6 kHz where the human ear is most sensitive, while attenuating very high and very low frequencies to which the ear is insensitive. The aim is to ensure that measured loudness corresponds well with subjectively perceived loudness. A-weighting is only really valid for relatively quiet sounds and for pure tones as it is based on the 40-phon Fletcher–Munson equal-loudness contour. The B and C curves were intended for louder sounds (though they are less used) while the D curve is used in assessing loud aircraft noise (IEC 537). B curves filter out more medium loudness levels when compared to an A curves. This curve is rarely ever used in the assessment or monitoring of noise levels anymore. C curves differ from both A and B in the fact that they filter less of the lower and higher frequencies. The filter is a much flatter shape and is used in sound measurement in especially loud and noisy environments. A weighted curves follow a 40 phon curve while C weighted follows a 100 phon curve. The three curves differ not in their measurement of exposure levels, but in the frequencies measured. A weighted curves allow more frequencies equal to or less than 500 Hz through, which is most representative of the human ear at lower volumes.

=== Loudness measurements with weighting filters ===
There are a variety of reasons for measuring sound. This includes following regulations to protect worker's hearing, following noise ordinances, in telecommunications, and many more. At the basis of sound measurement is the idea of breaking down an incoming signal based on its different properties. Every incoming sinusoidal wave of sound has a frequency and amplitude. Using this information, a sound level can be deduced from the root-sums-of-squares of the amplitudes of all the incoming auditory information. Whether using a sound level meter or a noise dosimeter, the processing is somewhat similar. With a calibrated sound level meter, the incoming sounds are going to be picked up by the microphone and then measured by the internal electronic circuits. The sound measurement that the device outputs can be filtered through an A, B, or C weighting curve. The curve used will have slight effects on the resulting decibel level.

=== Telecommunications ===
In the field of telecommunications, weighting filters are widely used in the measurement of electrical noise on telephone circuits, and in the assessment of noise as perceived through the acoustic response of different types of instrument (handset). Other noise-weighting curves have existed, e.g. DIN standards. The term psophometric weighting, though referring in principle to any weighting curve intended for noise measurement, is often used to refer to a particular weighting curve, used in telephony for narrow-bandwidth voiceband speech circuits.

=== Environmental noise measurement ===
A-weighted decibels are abbreviated dB(A) or dBA. When acoustic (calibrated microphone) measurements are being referred to, then the units used will be dB SPL (sound pressure level) referenced to 20 micropascals = 0 dB SPL. (Note: Caution: dBa, sometimes called dBrn adjusted, is not a synonym for dB(A).^{[A]})

The A-weighting curve has been widely adopted for environmental noise measurement, and is standard in many sound level meters (see ITU-R 468 weighting for a further explanation).

A-weighting is also in common use for assessing potential hearing damage caused by loud noise, though this seems to be based on the widespread availability of sound level meters incorporating A-Weighting rather than on any good experimental evidence to suggest that such use is valid. The distance of the measuring microphone from a sound source is often "forgotten", when SPL measurements are quoted, making the data useless. In the case of environmental or aircraft noise, distance need not be quoted as it is the level at the point of measurement that is needed, but when measuring refrigerators and similar appliances the distance should be stated; where not stated it is usually one metre (1 m). An extra complication here is the effect of a reverberant room, and so noise measurement on appliances should state "at 1 m in an open field" or "at 1 m in anechoic chamber". Measurements made outdoors will approximate well to anechoic conditions.

A-weighted SPL measurements of noise level are increasingly to be found on sales literature for domestic appliances such as refrigerators and freezers, and computer fans. Although the threshold of hearing is typically around 0 dB SPL, this is in fact very quiet indeed, and appliances are more likely to have noise levels of 30 to 40 dB SPL.

=== Audio reproduction and broadcasting equipment ===

Human sensitivity to noise in the region of 6 kHz became particularly apparent in the late 1960s with the introduction of compact cassette recorders and Dolby-B noise reduction. A-weighted noise measurements were found to give misleading results because they did not give sufficient prominence to the 6 kHz region where the noise reduction was having greatest effect, and sometimes one piece of equipment would measure worse than another and yet sound better, because of differing spectral content.

ITU-R 468 noise weighting was therefore developed to more accurately reflect the subjective loudness of all types of noise, as opposed to tones. This curve, which came out of work done by the BBC Research Department, and was standardised by the CCIR and later adopted by many other standards bodies (IEC, BSI/) and, as of 2006, is maintained by the ITU. Noise measurements using this weighting typically also use a quasi-peak detector law rather than slow averaging. This also helps to quantify the audibility of bursty noise, ticks and pops that might go undetected with a slow rms measurement.

ITU-R 468 noise weighting with quasi-peak detection is widely used in Europe, especially in telecommunications, and in broadcasting particularly after it was adopted by the Dolby corporation who realised its superior validity for their purposes. It is commonly used by broadcasters in Britain, Europe, and former countries of the British Empire such as Australia and South Africa.

Though the noise level of 16-bit audio systems (such as CD players) is commonly quoted (on the basis of calculations that take no account of subjective effect) as −96 dB relative to FS (full scale), the best 468-weighted results are in the region of −68 dB relative to Alignment Level (commonly defined as 18 dB below FS) i.e. −86 dB relative to FS.

== Other applications of weighting ==
In the measurement of gamma rays or other ionising radiation, a radiation monitor or dosimeter will commonly use a filter to attenuate those energy levels or wavelengths that cause the least damage to the human body, while letting through those that do the most damage, so that any source of radiation may be measured in terms of its true danger rather than just its 'strength'. The sievert is a unit of weighted radiation dose for ionising radiation, which supersedes the older unit the REM (roentgen equivalent man).

Weighting is also applied to the measurement of sunlight when assessing the risk of skin damage through sunburn, since different wavelengths have different biological effects. Common examples are the SPF of sunscreen, and the UV index.

Another use of weighting is in television, where the red, green and blue components of the signal are weighted according to their perceived brightness. This ensures compatibility with black and white receivers, and also benefits noise performance and allows separation into meaningful luminance and chrominance signals for transmission.

== See also ==
- Weighting
- Weighting curve
- Sone
- Phon
- ITU-R 468 noise weighting
- Psophometric weighting
- Equal-loudness contour
- Noise pollution
- Noise regulation
- A-weighting
- B-weighting
- C-weighting
- D-weighting
- G-weighting
- M-weighting
- Z-weighting
