= Flat weighting =

Form of weighting in noise measurement

In a noise-measuring set, flat weighting is a noise weighting based on an amplitude-frequency characteristic that is flat over a frequency range that must be stated.

== Notes ==
- Note 1: Flat noise power is expressed in dBrn (f_{1} − f_{2}) or in dBm (f_{1} − f_{2}).
- Note 2: "3 kHz flat weighting" and "15 kHz flat weighting" are based on amplitude-frequency characteristics that are flat between 30 Hz and the frequency indicated.

== Sources ==
This article incorporates public domain material from Federal Standard 1037C. General Services Administration. Archived from the original on 22 January 2022. (in support of MIL-STD-188).
