= Weighting curve =

A weighting curve is a graph of a set of factors, that are used to 'weight' measured values of a variable according to their importance in relation to some outcome. An important example is frequency weighting in sound level measurement where a specific set of weighting curves known as A-, B-, C-, and D-weighting as defined in IEC 61672 are used. Unweighted measurements of sound pressure do not correspond to perceived loudness because the human ear is less sensitive at low and high frequencies, with the effect more pronounced at lower sound levels. The four curves are applied to the measured sound level, for example by the use of a weighting filter in a sound level meter, to arrive at readings of loudness in phons or in decibels (dB) above the threshold of hearing (see A-weighting).

== Weighting curves in electronic engineering, audio, and broadcasting ==
Although A-weighting with a slow RMS detector, as commonly used in sound level meters is frequently used when measuring noise in audio circuits, a different weighting curve, ITU-R 468 noise weighting uses a psophometric weighting curve and a quasi-peak detector. This method, formerly known as CCIR weighting, is preferred by the telecommunications industry, broadcasters, and some equipment manufacturers as it reflects more accurately the audibility of pops and short bursts of random noise as opposed to pure tones. Psophometric weighting is used in telephony and telecommunications where narrow-band circuits are common. Hearing weighting curves are also used for sound in water.

== Other applications of weighting ==
Acoustics is by no means the only subject which finds use for weighting curves however, and they are widely used in deriving measures of effect for sun exposure, gamma radiation exposure, and many other things. In the measurement of gamma rays or other ionising radiation, a radiation monitor or dosimeter will commonly use a filter to attenuate those energy levels or wavelengths that cause the least damage to the human body, while letting through those that do the most damage, so that any source of radiation may be measured in terms of its true danger rather than just its "strength". The sievert is a unit of weighted radiation dose for ionising radiation, which supersedes the older weighted unit the rem (roentgen equivalent man).

Weighting is also applied to the measurement of sunlight when assessing the risk of skin damage through sunburn, since different wavelengths have different biological effects. Common examples are the SPF of sunscreen, and the ultraviolet index.

Another use of weighting is in television, where the red, green, and blue components of the signal are weighted according to their perceived brightness. This ensures compatibility with black-and-white receivers, and also benefits noise performance and allows separation into meaningful luminance and chrominance signals for transmission.

== See also ==
- Weight function
- Weighted arithmetic mean
- Weighting
- Weighting filter
- A-weighting
- B-, C-, D-, G-, and Z-weightings
- M-weighting
