= Sound level meter =

Device for acoustic measurements

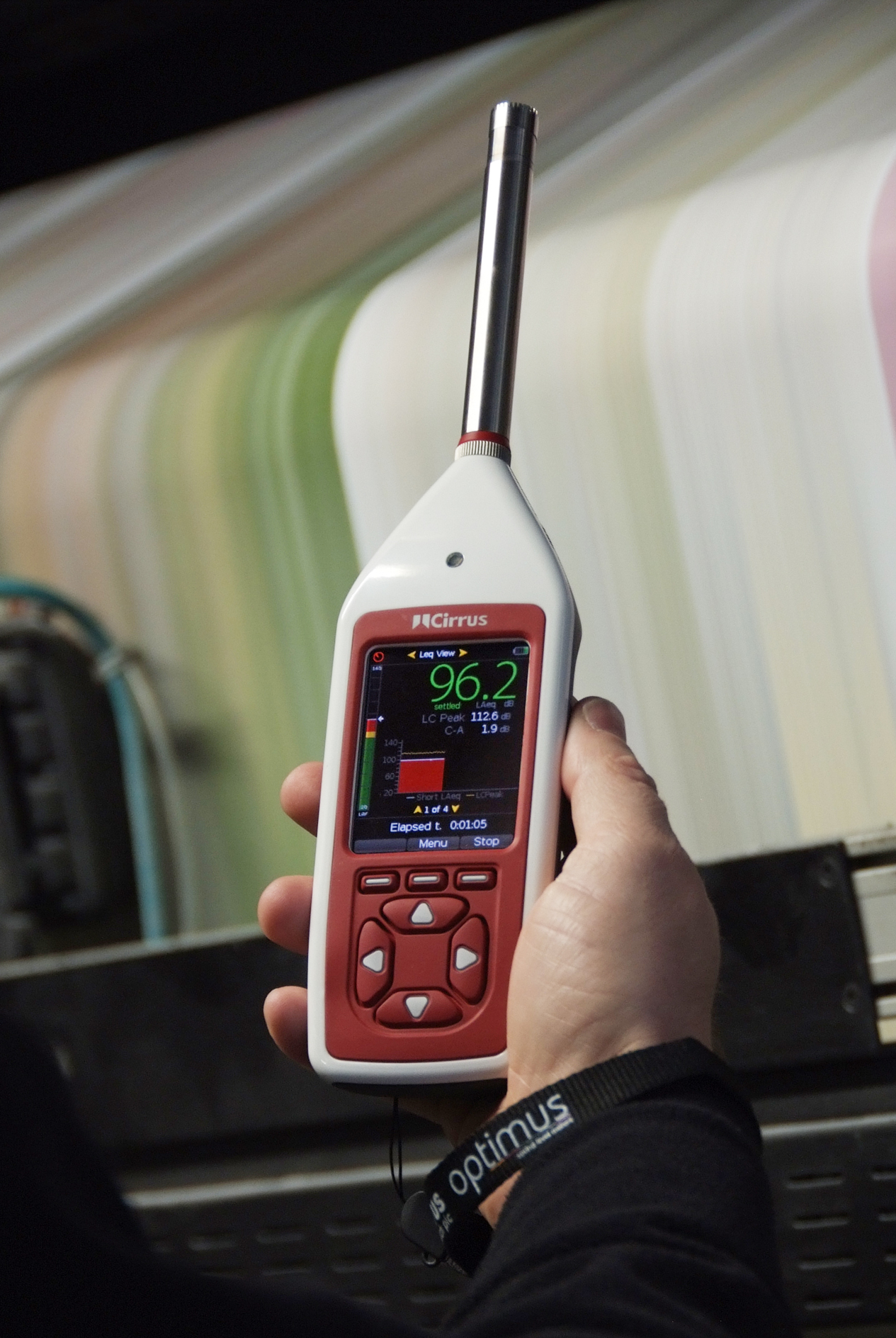
An integrating-averaging Cirrus Research's Optimus sound level meter which complies with IEC 61672-1:2002

A sound level meter (also called sound pressure level meter) is used for acoustic measurements. It is commonly a hand-held instrument with a microphone. The best type of microphone for sound level meters is the condenser microphone, which combines precision with stability and reliability. The diaphragm of the microphone responds to changes in air pressure caused by sound waves. That is why the instrument is sometimes referred to as a sound pressure level meter. This movement of the diaphragm, i.e. the sound pressure (unit pascal, Pa), is converted into an electrical signal (unit volt, V). While describing sound in terms of sound pressure, a logarithmic conversion is usually applied and the sound pressure level is stated instead, in decibels (dB), with 0 dB SPL equal to 20 micropascals.

A microphone is distinguishable by the voltage value produced when a known, constant root mean square sound pressure is applied. This is known as microphone sensitivity. The instrument needs to know the sensitivity of the particular microphone being used. Using this information, the instrument is able to accurately convert the electrical signal back to sound pressure, and display the resulting sound pressure level (unit decibel, dB).

Sound level meters are commonly used in noise pollution studies for the quantification of different kinds of noise, especially for industrial, environmental, mining and aircraft noise. The current international standard that specifies sound level meter functionality and performances is the IEC 61672-1:2013. However, the reading from a sound level meter does not correlate well to human-perceived loudness, which is better measured by a loudness meter. Specific loudness is a compressive nonlinearity and varies at certain levels and at certain frequencies. These metrics can also be calculated in a number of different ways.

The world's first hand-held and transistorized sound level meter was released in 1960 and developed by the Danish company Brüel & Kjær. In 1969, a group of University researchers from California founded Pulsar Instruments Inc. which became the first company to display sound exposure times on the scale of a sound level meter, as well as the sound level. This was to comply with the 1969 Walsh-Healey Act, which demanded that the noise in US workplaces should be controlled. In 1980, Britain's Cirrus Research introduced the world's first handheld sound level meter to provide integrated L_{eq} and sound exposure level (SEL) measurements.

== Classification ==
=== Types ===
The IEC 61672-1 specifies "three kinds of sound measuring instruments". They are the "conventional" sound level meter, the integrating-averaging sound level meter, and the integrating sound level meter.

The standard sound level meter can be called an exponentially averaging sound level meter as the AC signal from the microphone is converted to DC by a root-mean-square (RMS) circuit and thus it must have a time constant of integration; today referred to as the time-weighting. Three of these time-weightings have been internationally standardized, 'S' (1 s) originally called Slow, 'F' (125 ms) originally called Fast, and 'I' (35 ms) originally called Impulse. Their names were changed in the 1980s to be the same in any language. I-time-weighting is no longer in the body of the standard because it has little real correlation with the impulsive character of noise events.

The output of the RMS circuit is linear in voltage and is passed through a logarithmic circuit to give a readout linear in decibels (dB). This is 20 times the base 10 logarithm of the ratio of given root-mean-square sound pressure to the reference sound pressure. Root-mean-square sound pressure being obtained with a standard frequency weighting and standard time weighting. The reference pressure is set by the International agreement to be 20 micropascals for airborne sound. It follows that the decibel is, in a sense, not a unit, it is simply a dimensionless ratio; in this case the ratio of two pressures.

An exponentially averaging sound level meter, which gives a snapshot of the current noise level, is of limited use for hearing damage risk measurements; an integrating or integrating-averaging meter is usually mandated. An integrating meter simply integrates—or in other words 'sums'—the frequency-weighted noise to give sound exposure and the metric used is pressure squared times time, often Pa²·s, but Pa²·h is also used. However, because the unit of sound was historically described in decibels, the exposure is most often described in terms of sound exposure level (SEL), the logarithmic conversion of sound exposure into decibels.

=== Personal noise dosimeter ===
A common variant of the sound level meter is a noise dosemeter (dosimeter in American English). However, this is now formally known as a personal sound exposure meter (PSEM) and has its own international standard IEC 61252:1993.

A noise dosimeter (American) or noise dosemeter (British) is a specialized sound level meter intended specifically to measure the noise exposure of a person integrated over a period of time; usually to comply with Health and Safety regulations such as the Occupational Safety and Health (OSHA) 29 CFR 1910.95 Occupational Noise Exposure Standard or EU Directive 2003–10/EC.

This is normally intended to be a body-worn instrument and thus has a relaxed technical requirement, as a body-worn instrument—because of the presence of the body—has a poorer overall acoustic performance. A PSEM gives a read-out based on sound exposure, usually Pa²·h, and the older 'classic' dosimeters giving the metric of 'percentage dose' are no longer used in most countries. The problem with "%dose" is that it relates to the political situation and thus any device can become obsolete if the "100%" value is changed by local laws.

Traditionally, noise dosemeters were relatively large devices with a microphone mounted near the ear and having a cable going to the instrument body, itself usually belt worn. These devices had several issues, mainly the reliability of the cable and the disturbance to the user's normal work mode, caused by the presence of the cable. In 1997 following a UK research grant an EU patent was issued for the first of a range of devices that were so small that they resembled a radiation badge and no cable was needed as the whole unit could be fitted near the ear. UK designer and manufacturer, Cirrus Research, introduced the doseBadge personal noise dosimeter, which was the world's first truly wireless noise dosimeter. Today these devices measure not only simple noise dose, but some even have four separate dosemeters, each with many of the functions of a full-sized sound level meter, including in the latest models full octave band analysis.

=== Classes ===
IEC standards divide sound level meters into two "classes". Sound level meters of the two classes have the same functionality, but different tolerances for error. Class 1 instruments have a wider frequency range and a tighter tolerance than a lower cost Class 2 unit. This applies to both the sound level meter itself as well as the associated calibrator which is covered by the IEC 60942 standard. Most national standards permit the use of "at least a Class 2 instrument". For many measurements, it is not necessary to use a Class 1 unit, the additional uncertainty driven by the Class 2 instrument can be accommodated by increasing the stringency of the limit being assessed.

Similarly, the American National Standards Institute (ANSI) specifies sound level meters as three different Types 0, 1 and 2. These are described, as follows, in the Occupational Safety and Health OSHA Technical Manual TED01-00-015, Chapter 5, OSHA Noise and Hearing Conservation, Appendix III:A, "These ANSI standards set performance and accuracy tolerances according to three levels of precision: Types 0, 1, and 2. Type 0 is used in laboratories, Type 1 is used for precision measurements in the field, and Type 2 is used for general-purpose measurements. For compliance purposes, readings with an ANSI Type 2 sound level meter and dosimeter are considered to have an accuracy of ±2 dBA, while a Type 1 instrument has an accuracy of ±1 dBA. A Type 2 meter is the minimum requirement by OSHA for noise measurements and is usually sufficient for general-purpose noise surveys. The Type 1 meter is preferred for the design of cost-effective noise controls. For unusual measurement situations, refer to the manufacturer's instructions and appropriate ANSI standards for guidance in interpreting instrument accuracy."

== Measurements ==
Sound level label examples
- Description: Label
- Level A-weighted equivalent: LAeq
- Level A-weighted fast maximum: LAFmax
- Level C-weighted slow minimum: LCSmin
- Level Z-weighted impulse maximum: LZImax

Labels used to describe sound and noise level values are defined in the IEC Standard 61672-1:2013 For labels, the first letter is always an L. This stands for Level, as in the sound pressure level measured through a microphone or the electronic signal level measured at the output from an audio component, such as a mixing desk. Measurement results depend on the frequency weighting (how the sound level meter responds to different sound frequencies), and time weighting (how the sound level meter reacts to changes in sound pressure with time) applied.

=== Frequency weighting ===
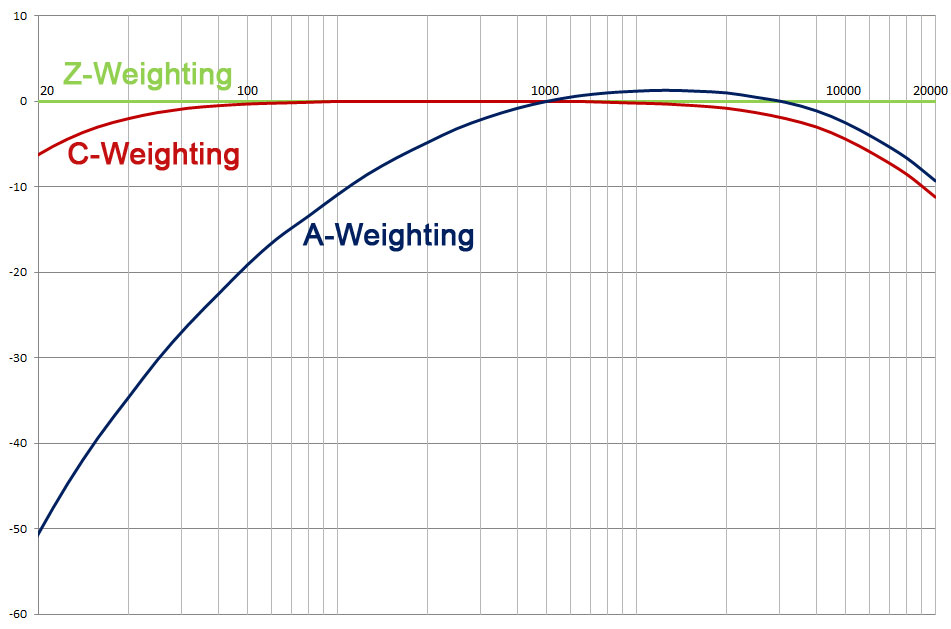
A, C and Z frequency weightings for sound

The second letter indicates the frequency weighting. "Pattern approved" sound level meters typically offer noise measurements with A, C and Z frequency weighting.

Z-weighting represents the sound pressure equally at all frequencies. A-weighting, weights lower and higher frequencies much less, and has a slight boost in the mid-range, representing the sensitivity of normal human hearing at low (quiet) levels. C-Weighting, more sensitive to the lower frequencies, represents what humans hear when the sound is loud (near 100 dB SPL).

The IEC 61672-1:2013 mandates the inclusion of an A-weighting filter in all sound level meters, and also describes C and Z (zero) frequency weightings. The older B and D frequency weightings are now obsolete and are no longer described in the standard.

In almost all countries, the use of A-weighting is mandated to be used for the protection of workers against noise-induced hearing loss. The A-weighting curve was based on the historical equal-loudness contours and while arguably A-weighting is no longer the ideal frequency weighting on purely scientific grounds, it is nonetheless the legally required standard for almost all such measurements and has the huge practical advantage that old data can be compared with new measurements. It is for these reasons that A-weighting is the only weighting mandated by the international standard, the frequency weightings 'C' and 'Z' being options.

Originally, the A-weighting was only meant for quiet sounds in the region of 40 dB sound pressure level (SPL), but is now mandated for all levels. C-weighting is however still used in the measurement of the peak value of a noise in some legislation, but B-weighting – a halfway house between 'A' and 'C' has almost no practical use. D-weighting was designed for use in measuring aircraft noise when non-bypass jets were being measured; after the demise of Concord, these are all military types. For civil aircraft noise measurements in the community around airports, A-weighting is used, as is mandated by the ISO and ICAO standards. For aircraft noise certification, EPNL is used, which still incorporates a version of the D-weighting curve.

=== Time weighting ===
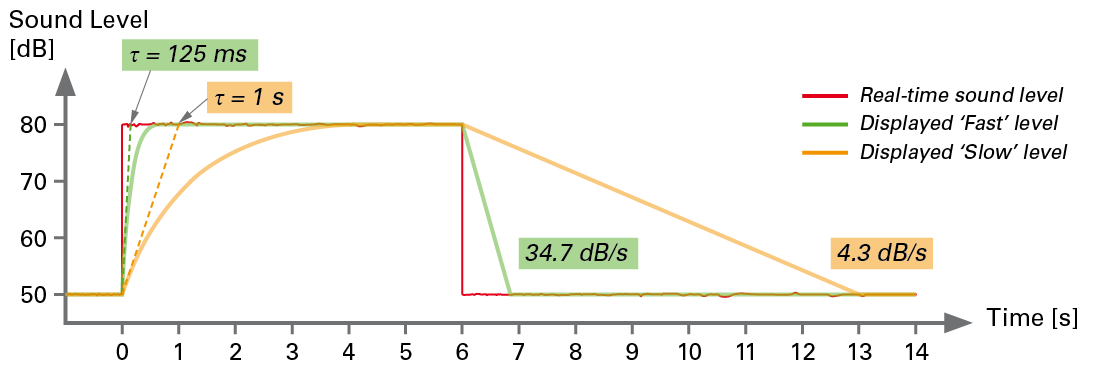
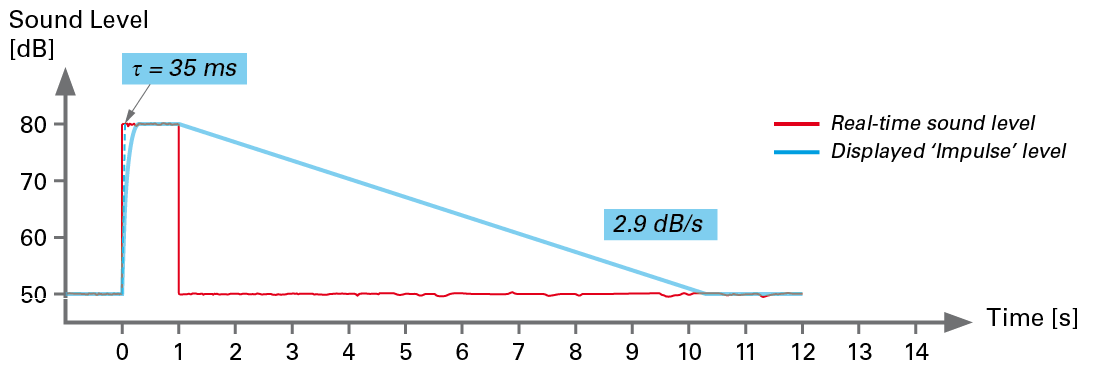
Graphs of fast, slow, and impulse time weightings applied so that sound levels measured are easier to read on a sound level meter

If the third letter is F, S or I, this represents the time weighting, with F = fast, S = slow, I = impulse. Time weighting is applied so that levels measured are easier to read on a sound level meter. The time weighting damps sudden changes in level, thus creating a smoother display.

Time weighting is an exponential time-averaging of the squared sound pressure. The current instrument standard IEC 61672-1 defines two time weightings: Fast (F), with a time constant of 125 ms, and Slow (S), with a time constant of 1 s. An older Impulse (I) time weighting, with a 35 ms rising time constant and a much slower decay, was specified in the now-superseded IEC 60651; it is still provided on some instruments but is no longer part of IEC 61672.

The graph indicates how this works. In this example, the input signal suddenly increases from 50 dB to 80 dB, stays there for 6 seconds, then drops back suddenly to the initial level.

A slow measurement (yellow line) will take approximately 5 seconds (attack time) to reach 80 dB and around 6 seconds (decay time) to drop back down to 50 dB. S is appropriate when measuring a signal that fluctuates a lot.

A fast measurement (green line) is quicker to react. It will take approximately 0.6 seconds to reach 80 dB and just under 1 second to drop back down to 50 dB. F may be more suitable where the signal is less impulsive.

The decision to use fast or slow is often reached by what is prescribed in a standard or a law. However, the following can be used as a guideline: The slow characteristic is mainly used in situations where the reading with the fast response fluctuates too much (more than about 4 dB) to give a reasonably well-defined value. Modern digital displays largely overcome the problem of fluctuating analogue meters by indicating the maximum r.m.s. value for the preceding second.

An impulse measurement (blue line) will take approximately 0.3 seconds to reach 80 dB and over 9 seconds to drop back down to 50 dB. The impulse response, I can be used in situations where there are sharp impulsive noises to be measured, such as fireworks or gunshots.

=== L_{AT} or L_{eq}: Equivalent continuous sound level ===
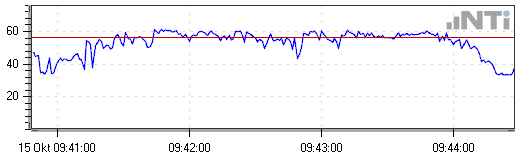
Graph of LAeq sound level measurement calculated over 5 minutes

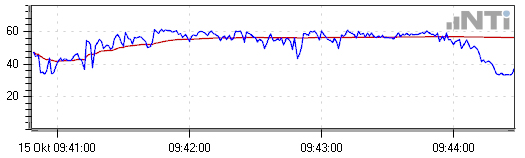
Graph of a continuous LAeq sound level measurement

eq = equivalent. Equivalent values are averaged over longer time and thus easier to read on a display than sound level with F, S or I time weighting.

If you look at these graphs of sound level over time, the area under the blue curve represents the energy. The horizontal red line drawn to represent the same area under the blue curve, gives us the LAeq. That is the equivalent value or average of the energy over the entire graph.

LAeq is not always a straight line. If the LAeq is plotted as the equivalent from the beginning of the graph to each of the measurement points, the plot is shown in the second graph.

Sound exposure level—in decibels—is not much used in industrial noise measurement. Instead, the time-averaged value is used. This is the time average sound level or as it is usually called the 'equivalent continuous sound level' has the formal symbol L_{AT} as described in paragraph 3,9 "Definitions" of IEC 61672-1 where many correct formal symbols and their common abbreviations are given. These mainly follow the formal ISO acoustic definitions. However, for mainly historical reasons, L_{AT} is commonly referred to as L_{eq}.

Formally, L_{AT} is 10 times the base 10 logarithm of the ratio of a root-mean-square A-weighted sound pressure during a stated time interval to the reference sound pressure and there is no time constant involved. To measure L_{AT} an integrating-averaging meter is needed; this in concept takes the sound exposure, divides it by time, and then takes the logarithm of the result.

=== Short L_{eq} ===
A variant of overall L_{AT} is "short L_{eq}" where very short L_{eq} values are taken in succession, say at 1/8 second intervals, each being stored in a digital memory. These data elements can either be transmitted to another unit or be recovered from the memory and re-constituted into almost any conventional metric long after the data has been acquired. This can be done using either dedicated programs or standard spreadsheets. Short L_{eq} has the advantage that as regulations change, old data can be re-processed to check if a new regulation is met. It also permits data to be converted from one metric to another in some cases. Today almost all fixed airport noise monitoring systems, which are in concept just complex sound level meters, use short L_{eq} as their metric, as a steady stream of the digital one second L_{eq} values can be transmitted via telephone lines or the Internet to a central display and processing unit. Short L_{eq} is a feature of most commercial integrating sound level meters—although some manufacturers give it different names.

Initially, L_{eq} was a concept of the French Government's Laboratoire National d'Essais (ref 1), it has now become the most common method of storing and displaying a true time history of the noise in professional commercial sound level meters. The alternative method, which is to generate a time history by storing and displaying samples of the exponential sound level, displays artifacts of the sound level meter, and such sampled data cannot be readily combined to form an overall set of data.

Until 2003 there were separate standards for exponential and linear integrating sound level meters, (IEC 60651 and IEC 60804—both now withdrawn), but since then the combined standard IEC 61672 has described both types of meter. For short L_{eq} to be valuable the manufacturer must ensure that each separate L_{eq} element fully complies with IEC 61672.

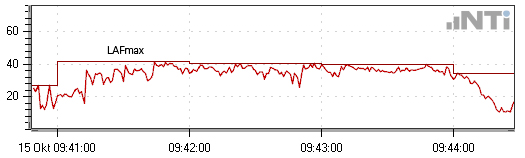
Graph of an LAFmax sound level measurement calculated every minute

=== L_{max} and L_{min} ===
If the words max or min appear in the label, this simply represents the maximum or minimum value measured over a certain period of time.

=== LC_{pk}: peak sound pressure level ===
Most national regulations also call for the absolute peak value to be measured to protect workers hearing against sudden large pressure peaks, using either 'C' or 'Z' frequency weighting. 'Peak sound pressure level' should not be confused with 'MAX sound pressure level'. 'Max sound pressure level' is simply the highest RMS reading a conventional sound level meter gives over a stated period for a given time-weighting (S, F, or I) and can be many decibels less than the peak value. In the European Union, the maximum permitted value of the peak sound level is 140 dB(C) and this equates to 200 Pa peak sound pressure. The symbol for the A-frequency and S-time weighted maximum sound level is LAS_{max}. For the C-frequency weighted peak it is LC_{pk} or L_{C,peak}.

== Standardization ==
=== Sound level meters ===
- IEC 61672 Ed. 2.0 (2013)
- IEC 60651 Ed 1.2 (2001) plus Amendment 1 (1993-02) and Amendment 2 (2000–10)
- IEC 60804 (2000–10)
- ANSI S1.4-2014 (a U.S. nationally adopted international standard from IEC 61672:2013)

=== Octave filters ===
- IEC 61260 Ed. 1.0 (2014) Electroacoustics – Octave-band and fractional-octave-band filters
- ANSI S1.11-2004 (R2009)

=== Personal noise dosimeters ===
- IEC 61252 Ed. 1.1 (2002–03)
- ANSI S1.25-1991(R2007)

=== Measurement microphones ===
- IEC 61094 : 2000

=== Room acoustics ===
- ISO 3382-1:2009 Measurement of Room Acoustic Parameters Part 1: Performance Rooms
- ISO 3382-2:2008 Measurement of Room Acoustic Parameters Part 2: Reverberation Time in Ordinary Rooms
- ASTM E2235 (2004) Standard Test Method for Determination of Decay Rates for Use in Sound Insulation Test Methods.

=== Equipment safety ===
IEC 61010-1 Ed. 2.0 (2001–02)

=== International standards ===
The following International standards define sound level meters, PSEM and associated devices. Most countries' national standards follow these very closely, the exception being the US. In many cases the equivalent European standard, agreed by the EU, is designated for example EN 61672 and the UK national standard then becomes BS. EN 61672.

- IEC 61672 : 2013 "Electroacoustics – sound level meters"
- IEC 61252 : 1993 "Electroacoustics – specifications for personal sound exposure meters"
- IEC 60942 : 2003 "Electroacoustics – sound calibrators"
- IEC 62585 : 2012 "Electroacoustics – Methods to determine corrections to obtain the free-field response of a sound level meter"

These International Standards were prepared by IEC technical committee 29:Electroacoustics, in cooperation with the International Organization of Legal Metrology (OIML).

Until 2003 there were separate standards for exponential and linear integrating sound level meters, but since then IEC 61672 has described both types. The classic exponential meter was originally described in IEC 123 for 'industrial' meters followed by IEC 179 for 'precision' meters. Both of these were replaced by IEC 651, later renamed IEC 60651, while the linear integrating meters were initially described by IEC 804, later renamed IEC 60804. Both IEC 60651 and 60804 included four accuracy classes, called "types". In IEC 61672 these were reduced to just two accuracy classes 1 and 2. New in the standard IEC 61672 is a minimum 60 dB linear span requirement and Z-frequency-weighting, with a general tightening of limit tolerances, as well as the inclusion of maximum allowable measurement uncertainties for each described periodic test. The periodic testing part of the standard (IEC61672.3) also requires that manufacturers provide the testing laboratory with correction factors to allow laboratory electrical and acoustic testing to better mimic Free field (acoustics) responses. Each correction used should be provided with uncertainties, that need to be accounted for in the testing laboratory final Measurement uncertainty budget. This makes it unlikely that a sound level meter designed to the older 60651 and 60804 standards will meet the requirements of IEC 61672 : 2013. These 'withdrawn' standards should no longer be used, especially for any official purchasing requirements, as they have significantly poorer accuracy requirements than IEC 61672.

=== Military standards ===
Combatants in every branch of the United States' military are at risk for auditory impairments from steady state or impulse noises. While applying double hearing protection helps prevent auditory damage, it may compromise effectiveness by isolating the user from his or her environment. With hearing protection on, a soldier is less likely to be aware of his or her movements, alerting the enemy to their presence. Hearing protection devices (HPD) could also require higher volume levels for communication, negating their purpose.

- MIL-STD 1474D The first military standard (MIL-STD) on sound was published in 1984 and underwent revision in 1997 to become MIL-STD-1474D. This standard establishes acoustical noise limits and prescribes testing requirements and measurement techniques for determining conformance to the noise limits specified herein. This standard applies to the acquisition and product improvement of all designed or purchased (non-developmental items) systems, subsystems, equipment, and facilities that emit acoustic noise. This standard is intended to address noise levels emitted during the full range of typical operational conditions.
- MIL-STD 1474E In 2015, MIL-STD 1474D evolved to become MIL-STD-1474E which, as of 2018, remains to be the guidelines for United States' military defense weaponry development and usage. In this standard, the Department of Defense established guidelines for steady state noise, impulse noise, aural non-detectability, aircraft and aerial systems, and shipboard noise. Unless marked with warning signage, steady state and impulse noises are not to exceed 85 decibels A-weighted (dBA) and, if wearing protection, 140 decibels (dBP) respectively. It establishes acoustical noise limits and prescribes testing requirements and measurement techniques for determining conformance to the noise limits specified herein. This standard applies to the acquisition and product improvement of all designed or purchased (non-developmental items) systems, subsystems, equipment, and facilities that emit acoustic noise. This standard is intended to address noise levels emitted during the full range of typical operational conditions. This standard includes two methods for assessing the impulse noise and risk to hearing.
  - The Auditory Hazard Assessment Algorithm for Humans (AHAAH), a one-dimensional electro-acoustic analog of the auditory system, produced MIL-STD 1474E's numerical guidelines. Over time the predictability of this algorithm has been claimed to have increased to 95% accuracy. US Army Research Laboratory researchers state that almost every error resulted in overcalculation of risk. By comparison, the MIL-STD-147D was deemed correct in 38% of cases with the same data. Originally developed from a cat animal model and later informed by human data, the AHAAH sums the basilar membrane displacements of 23 locations.The AHAAH model calculates the estimated displacement of the basilar membrane and summates the accumulation of the flexure of the basilar membrane. The user inputs their noise exposure, protection level, and whether they were forewarned of the noise, to receive their hazard vulnerability in auditory risk units (ARU). This value can be converted to compound threshold shifts and the allowed number of exposure (ANE). Compound threshold shifts is a value that integrates both temporary and permanent shifts in auditory threshold, the latter being correlated to hair cell function.
    - The AHAAH's claimed improvements in accuracy are often attributed to its sensitivity to the flexing of the middle ear muscle (MEM) and annular ligament of the stapes. When someone is forewarned of a sound, the MEM flexes, which is associated with reduced ability of the sound waves to reverberate. When an impulse sound is produced, the stape's annular ligament flexes and strongly clips the sound's oscillation peak. As the MIL-STD-1474 has evolved, technology and methods have improved the AHAAP's accuracy. Researchers claim that the AHAAP has been proven to be more accurate in cases of double protection but not always in unwarned impulse noise instances relative to the competitive metric LAeq8hr. Some suggestions for further development focus on creating a more user-friendly software, the placement of the microphone in data collection, the absence of the MEM reflex in populations, and the reevaluation of free-field conditions in calculations. Agencies such as NATO, the American Institute of Biological Sciences, and the National Institute for Occupational Safety and Health agreed that these suggestions be attended to before the metric is implemented. This shared conclusion was made prior to the development of MIL-STD-1474E.
  - The Level Impulse Equivalent Energy for 100 milliseconds (L_{IAeq100ms}) computes the integrated energy and equates it to a 100 ms interval. (L_{IAeq100ms}) incorporates an adjustment for the initial duration of a blast wave.
- TOP-1-2-608A This Test Operations Procedure (TOP) describes procedures for measuring the sound levels transmitted through air of developmental and production materiel as a means of evaluating personnel safety, speech intelligibility, security from acoustic detection and recognition, and community annoyance. It covers tests for steady-state noise from military vehicles and general equipment, and impulse noise from weapon systems and explosive-ordnance materiel.

=== Organizations ===
- The United Kingdom professional body for acoustics
- The International Institute for Noise control
- The home page of the IEC standards body

=== Pattern approval and periodic testing ===
A problem in selecting a sound level meter is "How do you know if it complies with its claimed standard?" This is a difficult question and IEC 61672 part 2 tries to answer this by the concept of "pattern approval". A manufacturer has to supply instruments to a national laboratory which tests one of them and if it meets its claims issue a formal Pattern Approval certificate. In Europe, the most common approval is often considered to be that from the PTB in Germany (Physikalisch-Technische Bundesanstalt). If a manufacturer cannot show at least one model in his range that has such approval, it is reasonable to be wary, but the cost of this approval militates against any manufacturer having all his range approved. Inexpensive sound level meters (under $200) are unlikely to have a Pattern Approval and may produce incorrect measurement results.

Even the most accurate approved sound level meter must be regularly checked for sensitivity—what most people loosely call 'calibration'. The procedures for periodic testing are defined within IEC61672.3-2013. To ensure accuracy in periodic testing, procedures should be carried out by a facility that can produce results traceable to International Laboratory Accreditation Cooperation, or other local International Laboratory Accreditation Cooperation signatories.

For a simple single level and frequency check, units consisting of a computer controlled generator with additional sensors to correct for humidity, temperature, battery voltage and static pressure can be used. The output of the generator is fed to a transducer in a half-inch cavity into which the sound level meter microphone is inserted. The sound level generated is 94 dB, which corresponds to a root-mean-square sound pressure of 1 pascal and is at a frequency of 1 kHz where all the frequency weightings have the same sensitivity.

For a complete sound level meter check, periodic testing outlined in IEC61672.3-2013 should be carried out. These tests excite the sound level meter across the entire frequency and dynamic range ensuring compliance with expected design goals defined in IEC61672.1-2013.

=== ANSI/IEC: the Atlantic divide ===
Sound level meters are also divided into two types in "the Atlantic divide". Sound level meters meeting the US American National Standards Institute (ANSI) specifications do not meet the corresponding International Electrotechnical Commission (IEC) specifications when used without regard to orientation. The ANSI standard describes instruments that are calibrated to a randomly incident wave, i.e. a diffuse sound field or "grazing incidence," IEC-standard meters are usually calibrated to a free field wave, that is sound coming from a single direction in line with the microphone axis. The same result is obtained with the ANSI meter oriented with the sound arriving at 90 degrees to the axis of the microphone as with the IEC meter with the microphone axis pointed at the sound.

While both ANSI style and IEC style meters can conform to the requirements of the international standard (which requires that the manufacturer identify the orientation of the meter with respect to the sound being measured) the IEC style meter requires that the microphone be pointed at the sound being measured for uniform response, while the ANSI style is calibrated for grazing or random incidence. For example, airport sound measurement microphones are oriented with the diaphragm horizontal -- this results in uniform response toward the horizon in all directions and IEC-style meters cannot be used because the microphone would need to be pointed at the sound source. The ANSI style grazing incidence microphone is also used both in the US and internationally in most aircraft noise certification tests with the microphone oriented 90° to the flight path so that line of the flight path lies on the extended plane of the diaphragm.

Further, US dosimeters have an exchange rate of level against time where every 5 dB increase in level halves the permitted exposure time; whereas in the rest of the world a 3 dB increase in level halves the permitted exposure time. The 3 dB doubling method is called the "equal energy" rule and there is no possible way of converting data taken under one rule to be used under the other. Despite these differences, many developing countries refer to both US and international specifications within one instrument in their national regulations. Because of this, many commercial PSEM have dual channels with 3 and 5 dB doubling, some even having 4 dB for the U.S. Air Force.

== Other applications ==
=== Building acoustics, sound insulation and reverberation time ===
Some advanced sound level meters can also include reverberation time (RT60) (a measure of the time required for the sound to "fade away" in an enclosed area after the source of the sound has stopped) measurement capabilities. Measurements can be done using the integrated impulse response or interrupted noise methods. Such sound level meters should comply with latest ISO 3382-2 and ASTM E2235-04 measurement standards.

Required for measuring the acoustics in buildings is a signal generator that provides pink or white noise through an amplifier and omnidirectional speakers. In fact, the omnidirectional speaker, or sound source, should provide an equal dispersion of sound throughout the room. To achieve accurate measurements, sound should radiate evenly. This can be achieved using a spherical distribution aligning 12 speakers in a so-called dodecahedral configuration, as illustrated by Brüel & Kjær OmniPower Sound Source Type 4292. All speakers should be connected in a series–parallel network, to achieve in-phase operation and impedance matching to the amplifier.

The reverberation-time measurements are often used to calculate wall/partition sound insulation or to quantify and validate building acoustics.

=== Noise monitoring stations ===
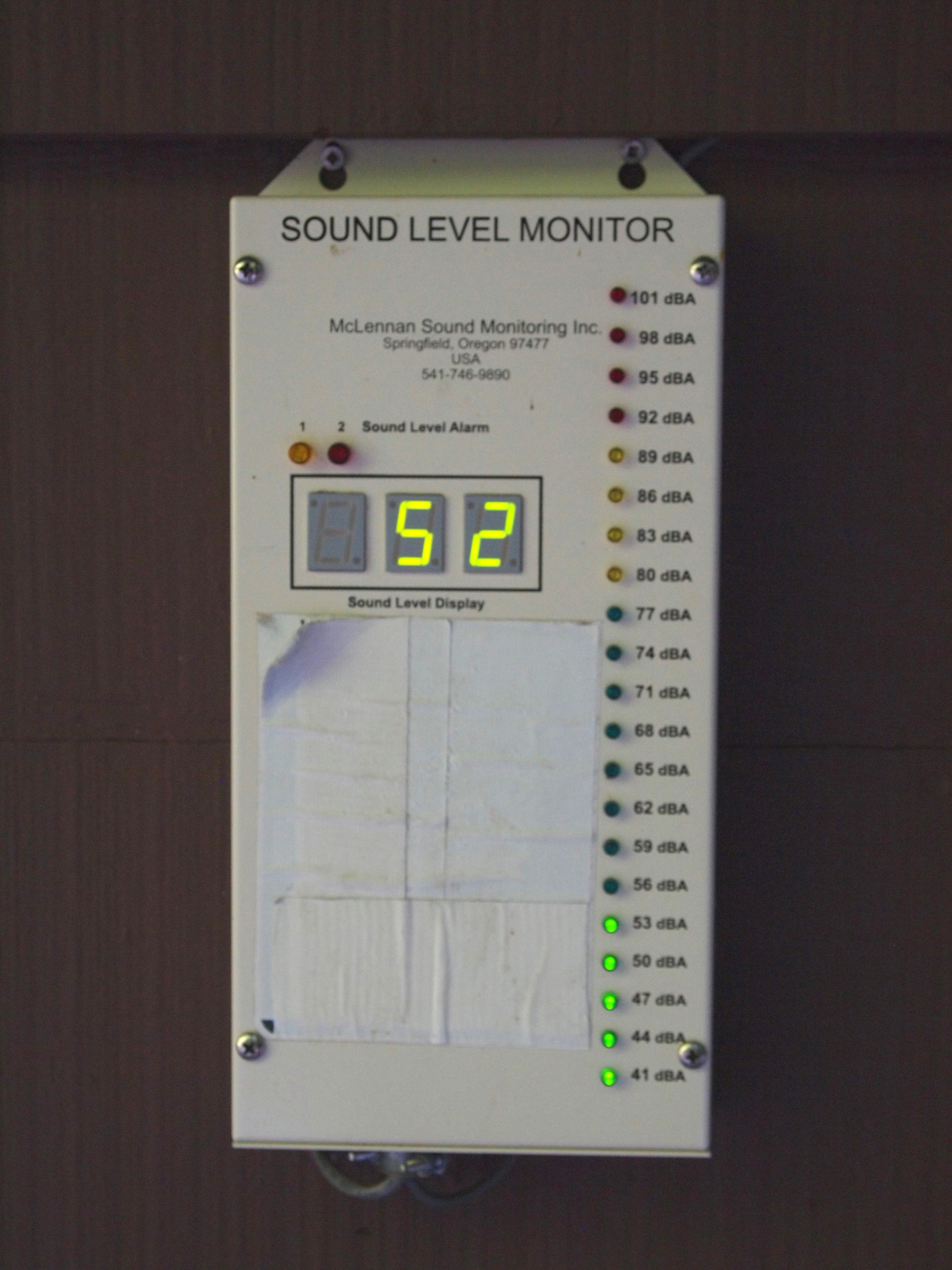
Noise monitoring station at Muir Woods National Monument in California

Some applications require the ability to monitor noise continuously on a permanent or semi-permanent basis. Some manufacturers offer permanent and semi-permanent noise monitoring stations for this purpose. Such monitoring stations are typically based on a sound level meter at the heart and some added capabilities such as remote communication, GPS, and weather stations. These can often also be powered using solar power. Applications for such monitoring stations include airport noise, construction noise, mining noise, traffic noise, rail noise, community noise, wind farm noise, industrial noise, etc.

Modern monitoring stations can also offer remote communication capabilities using cellular modems, WiFi networks or direct LAN wires. Such devices allow for real-time alerts and notifications via email and text messages upon exceeding a certain dB level. Systems can also remotely email reports on a daily, weekly or monthly basis. Real-time data publication is often also desired, which can be achieved by pushing data to a website.

=== Smartphone applications ===
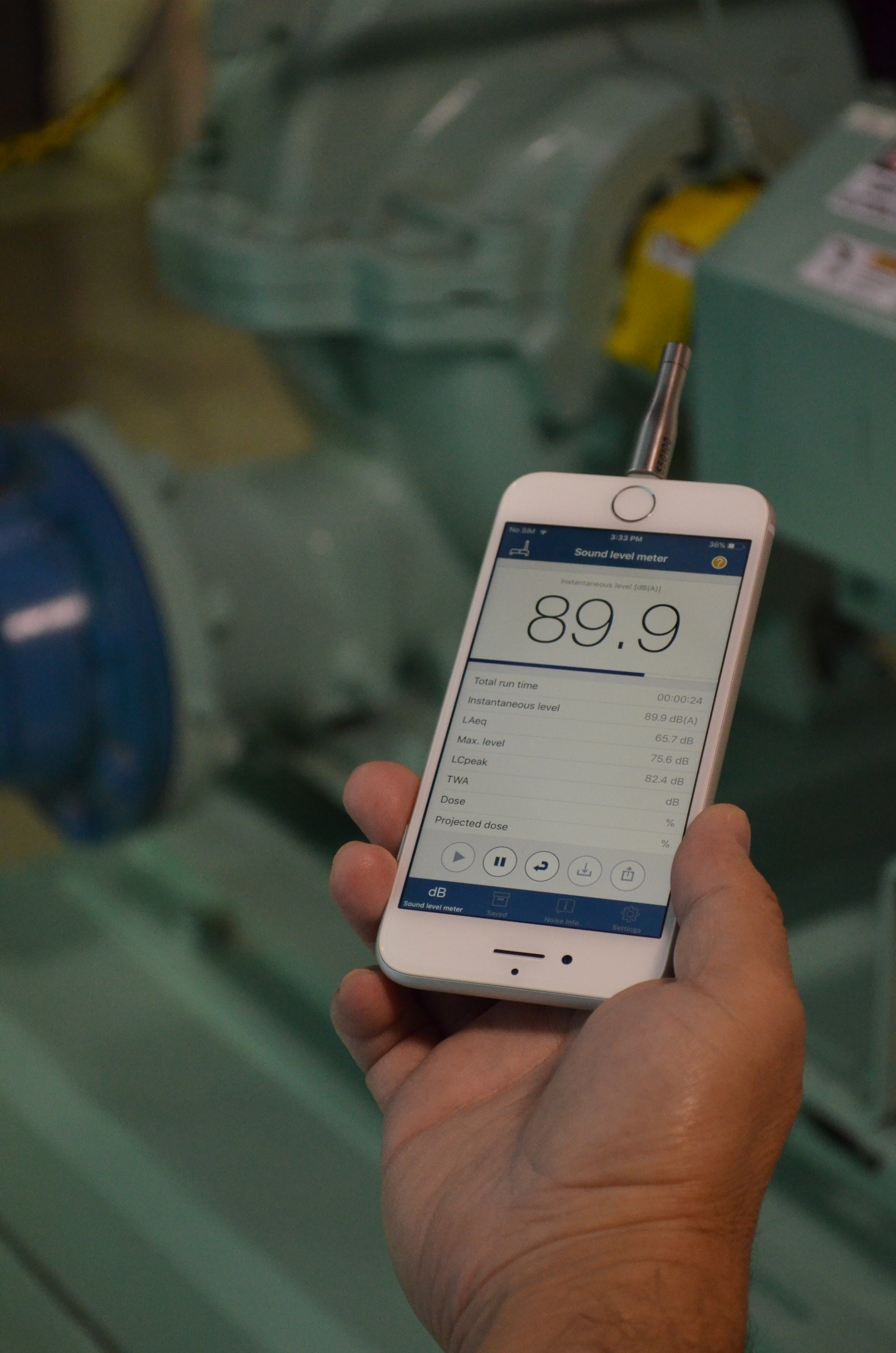
NIOSH sound level meter application (app)

The ubiquity of smartphones, their constant network connectivity, the built-in geographic information system functionality and user-interactivity features present an opportunity to revolutionize the way we investigate noise, its measurement, and its effects on hearing and overall health. The ability to acquire and display real-time noise exposure data raises people's awareness about their work (and off-work) environment and allows them to make informed decisions about hearing hazards and overall well-being. The National Institute for Occupational Safety and Health (NIOSH) conducted a pilot study to select and characterize the functionality and accuracy of smartphone sound measurement applications (apps) as an initial step in a broader effort to determine whether these apps can be relied on to conduct participatory noise monitoring studies in the workplace.

Researchers reported that challenges remain with using smartphones to collect and document noise exposure data due to encounters with privacy and collection of personal data, motivation to participate in such studies, corrupted or bad data, and the ability to store the data collected. Researchers concluded that smartphone sound apps can serve to empower workers and help them make educated decisions about their workplace environments. Although most smartphone sound measurement apps are not accurate enough to be used for legally required measurements, the NIOSH Sound Level Meter app met the requirements of IEC 61672/ANSI S1.4 Sound Level Meter Standards (Electroacoustics - Sound Level Meters - Part 3: Periodic Tests). Calibrated microphones greatly enhances the accuracy and precision of smartphone-based noise measurements. To calibrate the sound level meter apps one must use an acoustical calibrator rather than relying on the pre-defined profiles. This study indicated that the gap between professional instruments and smartphone-based apps are narrowing.

Healthy Hearing, an organization dedicated to hearing health, reported on the top smartphone sound level meter apps: NIOSH Sound Level Meter, Decibel X, and Too Noisy Pro.

== See also ==
- Equal-loudness contour
- ITU-R 468 noise weighting
- Audio system measurements
- Sound pressure
- Clap-o-meter

General:

- Noise measurement
- Noise regulation
- Health effects from noise
