= Psophometric weighting =

Psophometric weighting (from Greek: ψόφος : psóphos "noise") refers to any weighting curve used in the measurement of noise. In the field of audio engineering it has a more specific meaning, referring to noise weightings used especially in measuring noise on telecommunications circuits. Key standards are ITU-T O.41 and C-message weighting as shown here.

== Use ==
A major use of noise weighting is in the measurement of residual noise in audio equipment, usually present as hiss or hum in quiet moments of programme material. The purpose of weighting here is to emphasise the parts of the audible spectrum that ears perceive most readily, and attenuate the parts that contribute less to perception of loudness, in order to get a measured figure that correlates well with subjective effect.

== See also ==
- Audio system measurements
- Equal-loudness contour
- Fletcher–Munson curves
- Noise measurement
- Headroom
- Psophometric voltage
- Rumble measurement
- ITU-R 468 noise weighting
- A-weighting
- Weighting filter
- Weighting
- Weighting curve
