= Quasi-peak detector =

Type of electronic detector or rectifier

A quasi-peak detector is a type of electronic detector or rectifier. Quasi-peak detectors for specific purposes have usually been standardized with mathematically precisely defined dynamic characteristics of attack time, integration time, and decay time or fall-back time.

Quasi-peak detectors play an important role in electromagnetic compatibility (EMC) testing of electronic equipment, where allowed levels of electromagnetic interference (EMI), also called radio frequency interference (RFI), are given with reference to measurement by a specified quasi-peak detector. This was originally done because the quasi-peak detector was believed to better indicate the subjective annoyance level experienced by a listener hearing impulsive interference to an AM radio station. Over time standards incorporating quasi-peak detectors as the measurement device were extended to frequencies up to 1 GHz, although there may not be any justification beyond previous practice for using the quasi-peak detector to measure interference to signals other than AM radio. The quasi-peak detector parameters to be used for EMC testing vary with frequency. Both CISPR and the U.S. Federal Communications Commission (FCC) limit EMI at frequencies above 1 GHz with reference to an average-power detector, rather than quasi-peak detector.

Conceptually, a quasi-peak detector for EMC testing works like a peak detector followed by a lossy integrator. A voltage impulse entering a narrow-band receiver produces a short-duration burst oscillating at the receiver centre frequency. The peak detector is a rectifier followed by a low-pass filter to extract a baseband signal consisting of the slowly (relative to the receiver centre frequency) time-varying amplitude of the impulsive oscillation. The following lossy integrator has a rapid rise time and longer fall time, so the measured output for a sequence of impulses is higher when the pulse repetition rate is higher. The quasi-peak detector is calibrated to produce the same output level as a peak-power detector when the input is a continuous wave tone.

The CISPR quasi-peak detector is used in EMC testing and is defined in Publication 16 of the International Special Committee on Radio Interference (CISPR) of the International Electrotechnical Commission (IEC). The CISPR quasi-peak detector applied to most conducted emissions measurements (0.15–30 MHz) is a detector with an attack time of 1 ms, a decay time of 160 ms and an IF filter setting of 9 kHz. The quasi-peak detector applied to most radiated emissions measurements (30–1000 MHz) has an attack time of 1 ms, a decay time 550 ms and an IF filter bandwidth of 120 kHz.

In audio quality measurement, quasi-peak rectifiers are specified in several standards. For example ITU-R 468 noise weighting uses a special rectifier incorporating two cascaded charging time constants. The PPM or peak programme meter used to measure programme levels is actually a quasi-peak reading meter, again with precisely defined dynamics. Flutter measurement also involves a standardised quasi-peak reading meter. In every case the dynamics are chosen to reflect the sensitivity of human hearing to brief sounds, ignoring those so brief that we do not perceive them, and weighting those of intermediate duration according to audibility.

== See also ==
- Measuring receiver
- Peak programme meter
