= Noise dosimeter =

Sound level meter for measuring noise exposure over a period of time

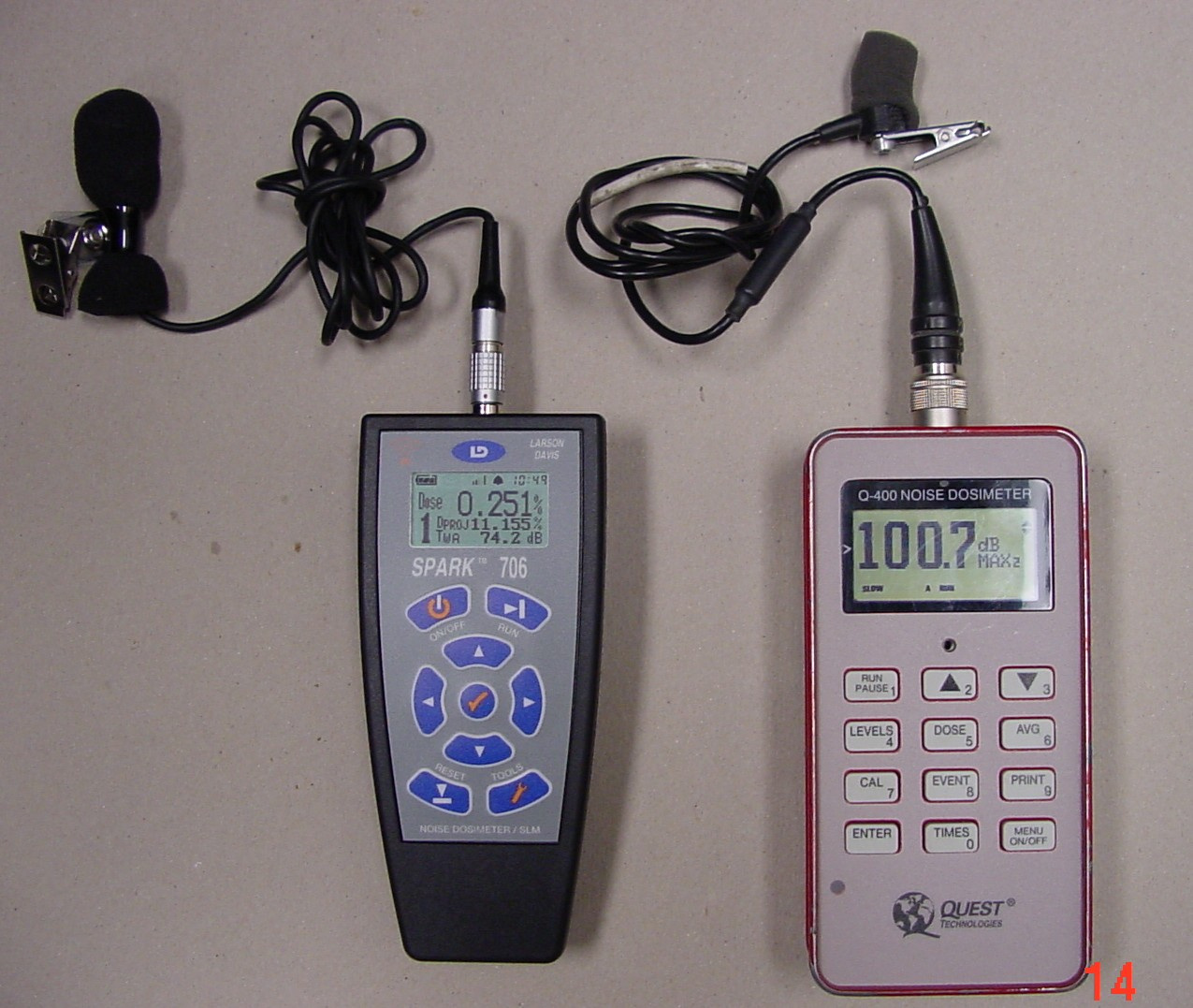
Personal noise dosimeters

A noise dosimeter (American English) or noise dosemeter (British English) is a specialized sound level meter intended specifically to measure the noise exposure of a person integrated over a period of time. It is often used to comply with Health and Safety regulations such as the Occupational Safety and Health (OSHA) 29 CFR 1910.95 Occupational Noise Exposure Standard or EU Directive 2003/10/EC.

== Noise Measurement ==
Noise dosimeters measure and store sound pressure levels (SPL) and, by integrating these measurements over time, provide a cumulative noise-exposure reading for a given period of time, such as an 8-hour workday. Dosimeters can function as personal or area noise monitors. In occupational settings, personal noise dosimeters are often worn on the body of a worker with the microphone mounted on the middle-top of the person's most exposed shoulder.

Area monitoring can be used to estimate noise exposure when the noise levels are relatively constant and employees are not mobile. In workplaces where employees move about in different areas or where the noise intensity tends to fluctuate over time, noise exposure is generally more accurately estimated by the personal monitoring approach.

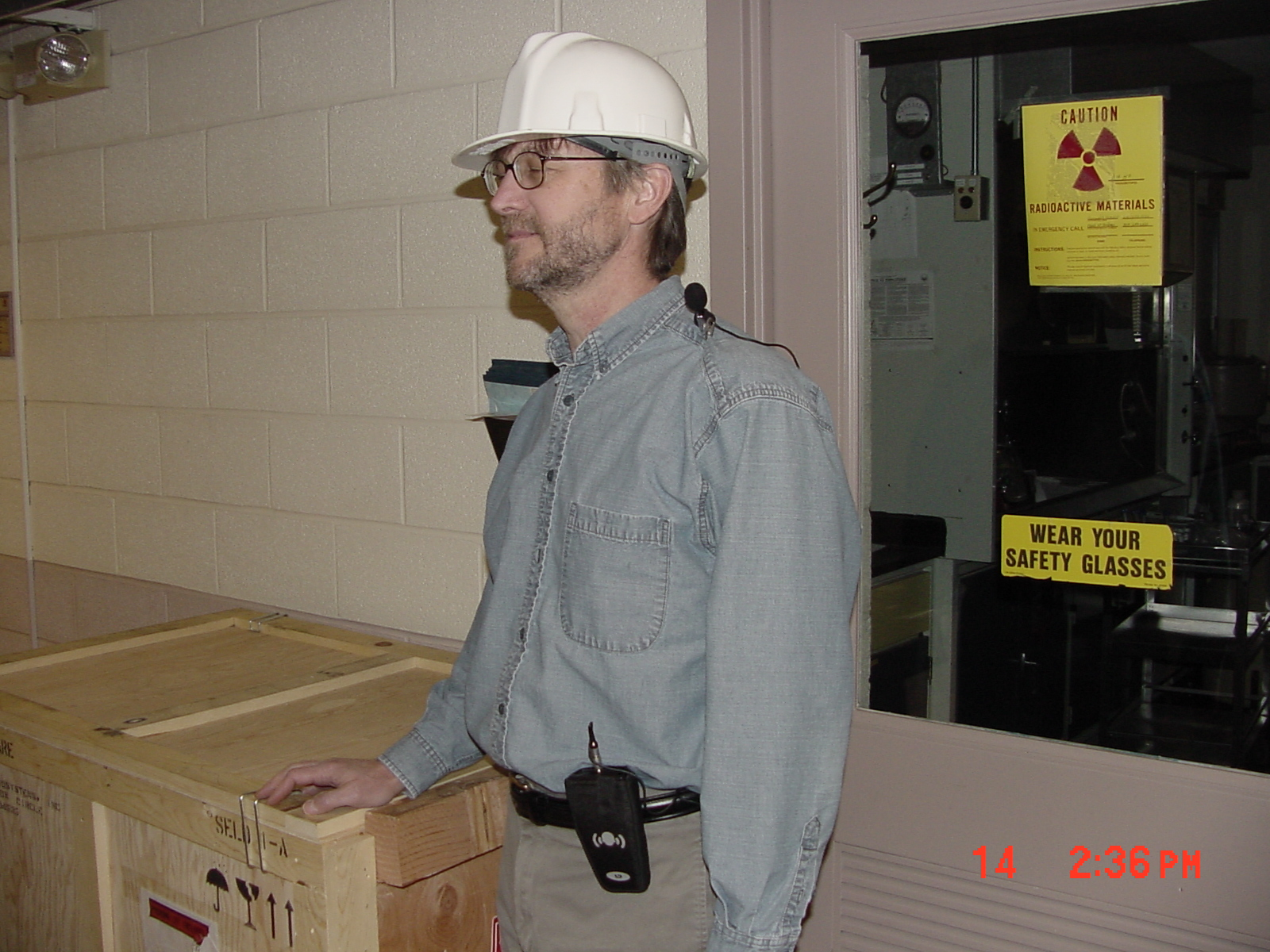
Worker wearing a personal noise dosimeter

Dosimeters are also used to collect data for use in legal proceedings, development of engineering noise controls, and other industrial hygiene purposes. When planning to conduct noise exposure measurements, steps must be taken to ensure that the dosimeters are calibrated and operated according to manufacturers' specifications. It is also necessary to understand the properties of the acoustic environment, the main measurement objectives as they relate to determining the risk to hearing damage, and the limitations associated with the use of dosimeters. Dosimeter manufacturers recommend that the instrument be calibrated with an acoustical calibrator such as a pistonphone before and after each measurement to verify reliable operation. In addition to field calibration routines, the manufacturers recommend periodic comprehensive calibration and certification of the instrument by an accredited laboratory using traceable reference sources. Field calibration of contemporary dosimeters has been mostly automated through PC-based programs that run the calibration routine, document the time and date, and adjust for any offset in levels.

== Occupational settings ==
Current dosimeters are designed to provide the user with parameters such as noise dose, time-weighted average, sound exposure level, as well as peak, maximum, and minimum sound pressure levels. Most dosimeters also generate statistical and graphical representations of the collected data. ANSI S1.25 specifies that dosimeters should at least provide the following parameters:

Frequency weighting: A-weighting or C-weighting
Exponential averaging: F (fast); S (slow)
Criterion level: 90, 85, 84, 80, or V (variable)
Criterion duration: Hours
Threshold level: 90, 80, or V (variable)
Exchange rate: 5, 4, or 3

A noise or sound dose is the amount of sound a person is exposed to in a day. The dose is represented by a percentage. A noise dose of 100% means that a person has exceeded the permissible amount of noise. Any noise exposure after the 100% noise dose may damage hearing. The exchange rate is the rate at which exposure accumulates. An addition of the exchange rate results in a halving of exposure time. The following table represents the exposure levels for occupational organizations as of November 2018:

OSHA	NIOSH	FRA	MSHA
Permissible Exposure Level: 90 dBA 8-hour TWA Action Level: 85 dBA 8-hour TWA	Recommended Exposure Limit: 85 dBA 8-hour TWA	Permissible Exposure Level: 90 dBA 8-hour TWA Action Level: 85 dBA 8-hour TWA	Permissible Exposure Level: 90 dBA 8-hour TWA Action Level: 85 dBA 8-hour TWA
5 dB exchange rate	3 dB exchange rate	5 dB exchange	5 dB exchange rate

== Standardization ==
The international body that specifies the technical requirements of such instruments as sound level meters and dosimeters is the International Electrotechnical Commission (IEC) based in Geneva; however, the method of their use is normally given in an International Organization for Standardization (ISO) publication. In the U.S., the American National Standards Institute (ANSI) ANSI S1.25-1991 (R2007) specifies the performance characteristics of personal noise dosimeters.

== Use of dosimeters ==
The original dosimeters were designed to be belt worn with a microphone connected to the body of the dosimeter and mounted on the shoulder as near to the ear as practicable. These devices were worn for the full work shift and at the end would give a readout initially in percentage dose, or in some other exposure metric. These were the most common way of making measurements to meet legislation in the US, but in Europe, the conventional sound level meter was favoured. There were many reasons for this, but in general in Europe the dosimeter was distrusted for several reasons, some being.

- The cable was considered dangerous as it could catch on rotating machinery
- The dosimeter could tell you the level had been exceeded, but it did not say when this happened
- Workers could falsify the data very easily
- The device was big enough to affect the work pattern

In the USA – where most of the early devices were manufactured, these reasons did not seem to matter so much.

To remove these European objections, dosimeters became smaller and started to include a data store where the Time History of the noise, usually in the form of Short Equivalent Sound Level (Leq) was stored. This data could be transferred to a personal computer and the exact pattern of the noise exposure minute by minute plotted. The usual method used was to store data in the form of Short Leq, a French concept that helped to bring computers into acoustics. As well, dosimeters started to incorporate besides the A-weighting a second C-frequency-weighted channel that allowed the true peak to be indicated. By the time the PSEM standard was published, many major sound level meter companies – in both Europe and the USA had a dosimeter in their range.

Noise dosimeters are worn by workers in order to track their sound exposure over a period of time. With the accuracy of a type 2 sound level meter, a majority of noise dosimeters measure within ±2 dB A. One must make sure to the noise dosimeter is properly calibrated and kept out of extreme temperature and humidity. The noise dosimeter is typically programmed by a hearing conservationist, sound engineer or audiologist. When the professional is setting up the noise dosimeter, settings like frequency of sound sampling and log information should be considered. When placing any dosimeter, the microphones should be clipped to the shoulder with the microphone facing upwards. The microphone should be placed in the open and clear from any surrounding fabric. It should also be protected from any wind source when outdoors and should have a wind screen over it for protection if needed. Over the course of the day, the dosimeter will measure the time-weighted average of the sound level the user experienced. It is important to make sure the batteries are fully charged since the dosimeter often has to run for 8 to 10 hours over the course of the work shift. Noise dosimeters do not record the user's voice, so it is important to teach the user how to operate and successfully use the device so the result is not influenced by the user's tampering.

== Companies ==
The following major manufacturers are among those who offer noise dosimeters:

- Denmark Brüel & Kjær
- United Kingdom Castle Group Ltd
- United Kingdom Casella CEL Ltd.
- United Kingdom Cirrus Research plc
- United Kingdom Pulsar Instruments plc
- USA 3M
- USA Larson-Davis
- France 01dB-Metravib
- Poland SVANTEK
- Japan RION CO., Ltd
