= Phon =

Logarithmic unit of loudness level

Equal-loudness contours

The phon is a logarithmic unit of loudness level for tones and complex sounds. Loudness is measured in sones, a linear unit. Human sensitivity to sound is variable across different frequencies, so although two different tones may present an identical sound pressure to a human ear, they may be psychoacoustically perceived as differing in loudness. The purpose of the phon is to provide a logarithmic measurement, such as decibels (dB) for perceived sound magnitude, while the primary loudness standard methods result in a linear representation. A sound with a loudness of 1 sone is judged equally loud as a 1 kHz tone with a sound pressure level of 40 dB above 20 micropascals. The phon is psychophysically matched to a reference frequency of 1 kHz. In other words, the phon matches the sound pressure level in decibels (dB SPL) of a similarly perceived 1 kHz pure tone. For instance, if a sound is perceived to be equal in intensity to a 1 kHz tone with an SPL of 50 dB, then it has a loudness of 50 phons, regardless of its physical properties. The phon was proposed in DIN 45631 and ISO 532 B by Stanley Smith Stevens.

== Definition ==
By definition, the loudness level in phons of a sound is the sound pressure level (in dB) of a 1 kHz pure tone that is judged as having the same loudness. The phon unit is not an SI unit in metrology. It is defined as a unit of loudness level by the American National Standards Institute in the Acoustical Terminology standard ANSI/ASA S1.1-2013. Because the phon is a unit associated with a subjective percept, it is obtained by presenting the considered sound to a group of normal-hearing human listeners and by taking the median of the loudness levels they report.

Such measurements have been performed for known sounds, such as pure tones at different frequencies and levels. The equal-loudness contours are a way of mapping the dB SPL of a pure tone to the perceived loudness level in phons (see loudness for details).

== See also ==
- A-weighting
