= A-weighting =

Frequency response curves used in sound pressure level measurement

A graph of the A-, B-, C- and D-weightings across the frequency range 10 Hz – 20 kHz

Video illustrating A-weighting by analyzing a sine sweep (contains audio)

A-weighting is a form of frequency weighting and the most commonly used of a family of curves defined in the International standard IEC 61672:2003 and various national standards relating to the measurement of sound pressure level. A-weighting is applied to instrument-measured sound levels in an effort to account for the relative loudness perceived by the human ear, as the ear is less sensitive to low audio frequencies. It is employed by arithmetically adding a table of values, listed by octave or third-octave bands, to the measured sound pressure levels in decibel (dB). The resulting octave band measurements are usually added (logarithmic method) to provide a single A-weighted value describing the sound; the units are written as dB(A). Other weighting sets of values – B, C, D and now Z – are discussed below.

The curves were originally defined for use at different average sound levels, but A-weighting, though originally intended only for the measurement of low-level sounds (around 40 phon), is now commonly used for the measurement of environmental noise and industrial noise, as well as when assessing potential hearing damage and other noise health effects at all sound levels; indeed, the use of A-frequency-weighting is now mandated for all these measurements, because decades of field experience have shown a good correlation with occupational deafness in the frequency range of human speech. It is also used when measuring low-level noise in audio equipment, especially in the United States. In Britain, Europe and other parts of the world, broadcasters and audio engineers more often use the ITU-R 468 noise weighting, which was developed in the 1960s based on research by the BBC and other organizations. This research showed that our ears respond differently to random noise, and the equal-loudness curves on which the A, B and C weightings were based are really only valid for pure single tones.

== History ==
A-weighting began with work by Fletcher and Munson which resulted in their publication, in 1933, of a set of equal-loudness contours. Three years later these curves were used in the first American standard for sound level meters. This ANSI standard, later revised as ANSI S1.4-1981, incorporated B-weighting as well as the A-weighting curve, recognising the unsuitability of the latter for anything other than low-level measurements. But B-weighting has since fallen into disuse.

== Deficiencies ==
A-weighting is valid to represent the sensitivity of the human ear as a function of the frequency of pure tones. The A-weighting was based on the 40-phon Fletcher–Munson curves, which represented an early determination of the equal-loudness contour for human hearing. However, this scale is employed in multiple jurisdictions to evaluate the risks of occupational deafness and other auditory problems related to signals or speech intelligibility in noisy environments.

Because of perceived discrepancies between early and more recent determinations, the International Organization for Standardization (ISO) revised its standard curves as defined in ISO 226, in response to the recommendations of a study coordinated by the Research Institute of Electrical Communication, Tohoku University, Japan. The study produced new curves by combining the results of several studies, by researchers in Japan, Germany, Denmark, UK, and USA. (Japan was the greatest contributor with about 40% of the data.) This resulted in the acceptance of a new set of curves standardized as ISO 226:2003 (subsequently revised again in 2023 with changes to the ISO 226 equal loudness contours of less than 0.5 dB over the 20-90 phon range). The report comments on the large differences between the combined study results and the original Fletcher–Munson equal loudness contours, as well as the later Robinson-Dadson contours that formed the basis for the first version of ISO 226, published in 1987. Subsequent research has demonstrated that A-weighting is in closer agreement with the updated 60-phon contour incorporated into ISO 226:2003 than with the 40-phon Fletcher-Munson contour, which challenges the common misapprehension that A-weighting represents loudness only for quiet sounds.

Nevertheless, A-weighting would be a closer match to the equal loudness curves if it fell more steeply above 10 kHz, and it is conceivable that this compromise may have arisen because steep filters were more difficult to construct in the early days of electronics. Nowadays, no such limitation need exist, as demonstrated by the ITU-R 468 curve. If A-weighting is used without further band-limiting it is possible to obtain different readings on different instruments when ultrasonic, or near ultrasonic noise is present. Accurate measurements therefore require a 20 kHz low-pass filter to be combined with the A-weighting curve in modern instruments. This is defined in IEC 61012 as AU weighting and while desirable, is rarely fitted to commercial sound level meters.

== B-, C-, D-, G- and Z-weightings ==
A-frequency-weighting is mandated by the international standard IEC 61672 to be fitted to all sound level meters and are approximations to the equal loudness contours given in ISO 226. The old B- and D-frequency-weightings have fallen into disuse, but multiple sound level meters provide for C frequency-weighting and its fitting is mandated—at least for testing purposes—to precision (Class one) sound level meters. D-frequency-weighting was specifically designed for use when measuring high-level aircraft noise in accordance with the IEC 537 measurement standard. The large peak in the D-weighting curve is not a feature of the equal-loudness contours, but reflects the fact that humans hear random noise differently from pure tones, an effect that is particularly pronounced around 6 kHz. This is because individual neurons from different regions of the cochlea in the inner ear respond to narrow bands of frequencies, but the higher frequency neurons integrate a wider band and hence signal a louder sound when presented with noise containing multiple frequencies than for a single pure tone of the same pressure level.

Following changes to the ISO standard, D-frequency-weighting by itself should now only be used for non-bypass-type jet engines, which are found only on military aircraft and not on commercial aircraft. For this reason, today A-frequency-weighting is now mandated for light civilian propeller aircraft measurements, while a more accurate loudness-corrected weighting EPNdB is required for certification of jets and helicopters. D-weighting is the basis for the measurement underlying EPNdB.

Z- or ZERO frequency-weighting was introduced in the International Standard IEC 61672 in 2003 and was intended to replace the flat or linear frequency weighting often fitted by manufacturers. It is a flat frequency response between 10 Hz and 20 kHz ±1.5 dB. As well, the C-frequency-weighting, with –3 dB points at 31.5 Hz and 8 kHz did not have a sufficient bandpass to allow the sensibly correct measurement of true peak noise (Lpk).

G-weighting is used for measurements in the infrasound range from 8 Hz to about 40 Hz.

B- and D-frequency-weightings are no longer described in the body of the standard IEC 61672:2003, but their frequency responses can be found in the older IEC 60651, although that has been formally withdrawn by the International Electrotechnical Commission in favour of IEC 61672:2003. The frequency weighting tolerances in IEC 61672 have been tightened over those in the earlier standards IEC 179 and IEC 60651 and thus instruments complying with the earlier specifications should no longer be used for legally required measurements.

== Environmental and other noise measurements ==
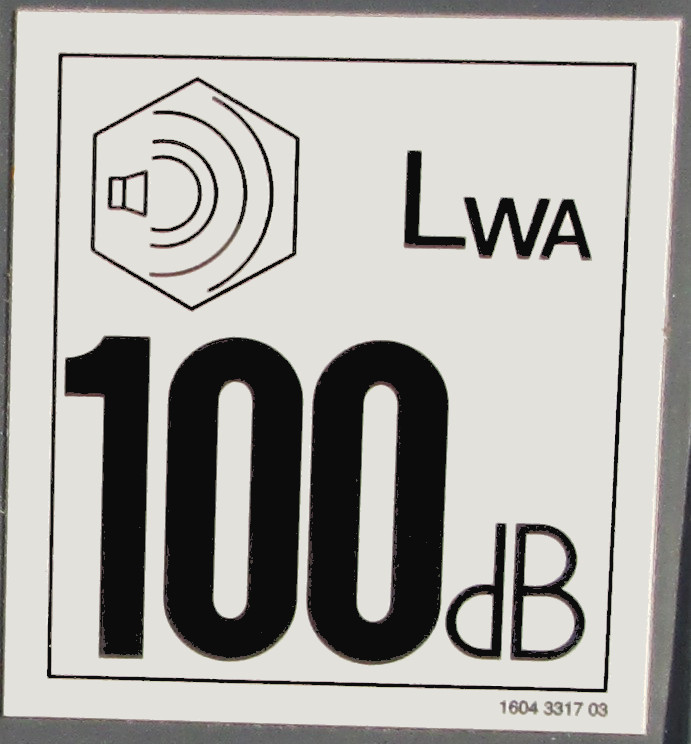
Label related to a portable air compressor

A-weighted decibels are abbreviated dB(A) or dBA. When acoustic (calibrated microphone) measurements are being referred to, then the units used will be dB SPL referenced to 20 micropascals = 0 dB SPL. (Note: dBrn adjusted is not a synonym for dB(A), but for dBa. (In telecommunications dBa denotes "decibels adjusted", i.e. weighted absolute noise power, which has nothing to do with A-weighting.))

The A-weighting curve has been adopted for environmental noise measurement, and is standard in a number of sound level meters. The A-weighting system is used in any measurement of environmental noise (examples of which include roadway noise, rail noise, aircraft noise). A-weighting is also in common use for assessing potential hearing damage caused by loud noise, including noise dose measurements at work. A noise level of more than 85 dB(A) each day increases the risk factor for hearing damage.

A-weighted sound power levels L_{WA} are increasingly found on sales literature for domestic appliances such as refrigerators, freezers and computer fans. The expected sound pressure level to be measured at a given distance as SPL with a sound level meter can with some simplifications be calculated from the sound power level. In Europe, the A-weighted noise level is used for instance for normalizing the noise of tires on cars.

== Audio reproduction and broadcasting equipment ==

Although the A-weighting curve, in widespread use for noise measurement, is said to have been based on the 40-phon Fletcher-Munson curve, research in the 1960s demonstrated that determinations of equal-loudness made using pure tones are not directly relevant to our perception of noise. This is because the cochlea in our inner ear analyses sounds in terms of spectral content, each hair cell responding to a narrow band of frequencies known as a critical band. The high-frequency bands are wider in absolute terms than the low-frequency bands, and therefore 'collect' proportionately more power from a noise source. However, when more than one critical band is stimulated, the outputs of the various bands are summed by the brain to produce an impression of loudness. For these reasons equal-loudness curves derived using noise bands show an upwards tilt above 1 kHz and a downward tilt below 1 kHz when compared to the curves derived using pure tones.

This enhanced sensitivity to noise in the region of 6 kHz became particularly apparent in the late 1960s with the introduction of compact cassette recorders and Dolby-B noise reduction. A-weighted noise measurements were found to give misleading results because they did not give sufficient prominence to the 6 kHz region where the noise reduction was having greatest effect, and did not sufficiently attenuate noise around 10 kHz and above (a particular example is with the 19 kHz pilot tone on FM radio systems which, though usually inaudible, is not sufficiently attenuated by A-weighting, so that sometimes one piece of equipment would even measure worse than another and yet sound better, because of differing spectral content.

ITU-R 468 noise weighting was therefore developed to more accurately reflect the subjective loudness of all types of noise, as opposed to tones. This curve, which came out of work done by the BBC Research Department, and was standardised by the CCIR and later adopted by multiple other standards bodies (IEC, BSI) and, as of 2006, is maintained by the ITU. It became widely used in Europe, especially in broadcasting, and was adopted by Dolby Laboratories who realised its superior validity for their purposes when measuring noise on film soundtracks and compact cassette systems. Its advantages over A-weighting are less accepted in the US, where the use of A-weighting still predominates. It is used by broadcasters in Britain, Europe, and former countries of the British Empire such as Australia and South Africa.

== Function realisation of some common weightings ==
The standard defines weightings ($A(f), C(f)$) in dB units by tables with tolerance limits (to allow a variety of implementations). Additionally, the standard describes weighting functions $R_X(f)$ to calculate the weightings. The weighting function $R_X(f)$ is applied to the amplitude spectrum (not the intensity spectrum) of the unweighted sound level. The offsets ensure the normalisation to 0 dB at 1000 Hz. Appropriate weighting functions are:

=== A ===
$$\begin{align}
R_A(f) &= {12194^2 f^4 \over \left(f^2 + 20.6^2\right)\ \sqrt{\left(f^2 + 107.7^2\right)\left(f^2 + 737.9^2\right)}\ \left(f^2 + 12194^2\right)}\ ,\\[3pt]
A(f) &= 20\log_{10}\left(R_A(f)\right) - 20\log_{10}\left(R_A(1000)\right) \\
&\approx 20\log_{10}\left(R_A(f)\right) + 2.00
\end{align}$$

=== B ===
$$\begin{align}
R_B(f) &= {12194^2 f^3\over \left(f^2 + 20.6^2\right)\ \sqrt{\left(f^2 + 158.5^2\right)} \  \left(f^2 + 12194^2\right)}\ ,\\[3pt]
B(f) &= 20\log_{10}\left(R_B(f)\right) - 20\log_{10}\left(R_B(1000)\right) \\
&\approx 20\log_{10}\left(R_B(f)\right) + 0.17
\end{align}$$

=== C ===
$$\begin{align}
R_C(f) &= {12194^2 f^2 \over \left(f^2 + 20.6^2\right)\ \left(f^2 + 12194^2\right)}\ ,\\[3pt]
C(f) &= 20\log_{10}\left(R_C(f)\right) - 20\log_{10}\left(R_C(1000)\right) \\[3pt]
&\approx 20\log_{10}\left(R_C(f)\right) + 0.06
\end{align}$$

=== D ===
$$\begin{align}
h(f) &= \frac{\left(1037918.48 - f^2\right)^2 + 1080768.16\,f^2}{\left(9837328 - f^2\right)^2 + 11723776\,f^2} \\[3pt]
R_D(f) &= \frac{f}{6.8966888496476 \cdot 10^{-5}} \sqrt{\frac{h(f)}{\left(f^2 + 79919.29\right)\left(f^2 + 1345600\right)}} \\
D(f) &= 20\log_{10}\left(R_D(f)\right) - 20\log_{10}\left(R_D(1000)\right)
\end{align}$$

== Transfer function equivalent ==
The gain curves can be realised by the following s-domain transfer functions. They are not defined in this way though, being defined by tables of values with tolerances in the standards documents, thus allowing different realisations:

=== A ===
$$H_\text{A}(s) \approx {k_\text{A} \cdot s^4 \over (s + 129.4)^2\quad(s + 676.7)\quad (s + 4636)\quad (s + 76617)^2}$$
k_{A} ≈ 7.39705 × 10^{9}

=== B ===
$$H_\text{B}(s) \approx {k_\text{B} \cdot s^3\over(s + 129.4)^2\quad (s + 995.9)\quad (s + 76617)^2}$$
k_{B} ≈ 5.99185 × 10^{9}

=== C ===
$$H_\text{C}(s) \approx {k_\text{C} \cdot s^2\over(s + 129.4)^2\quad (s + 76617)^2}$$
k_{C} ≈ 5.91797 × 10^{9}

=== D ===
$$H_\text{D}(s) \approx {k_\text{D} \cdot s \cdot \left(s^2 + 6532 s + 4.0975 \times 10^7\right)\over(s + 1776.3)\quad (s + 7288.5)\quad \left(s^2 + 21514 s + 3.8836 \times 10^8\right)}$$
k_{D} ≈ 91104.32

The k-values are constants that are used to normalize the function to a gain of 1 (0 dB). The values listed above normalize the functions to 0 dB at 1 kHz, as they are typically used. (This normalization is shown in the image.)

== See also ==
- Audio quality measurement
- Headroom
- ITU-R 468 noise weighting
- LKFS
- Luminous efficiency function, the light equivalent
- M-weighting
- Noise
- Noise pollution
- Noise regulation
- Psophometric weighting
- Rumble measurement
- Signal noise
- Weighting curve
- Weighting filter
