= Nakamichi Dragon =

High end hifi cassette deck

- Cassette deck
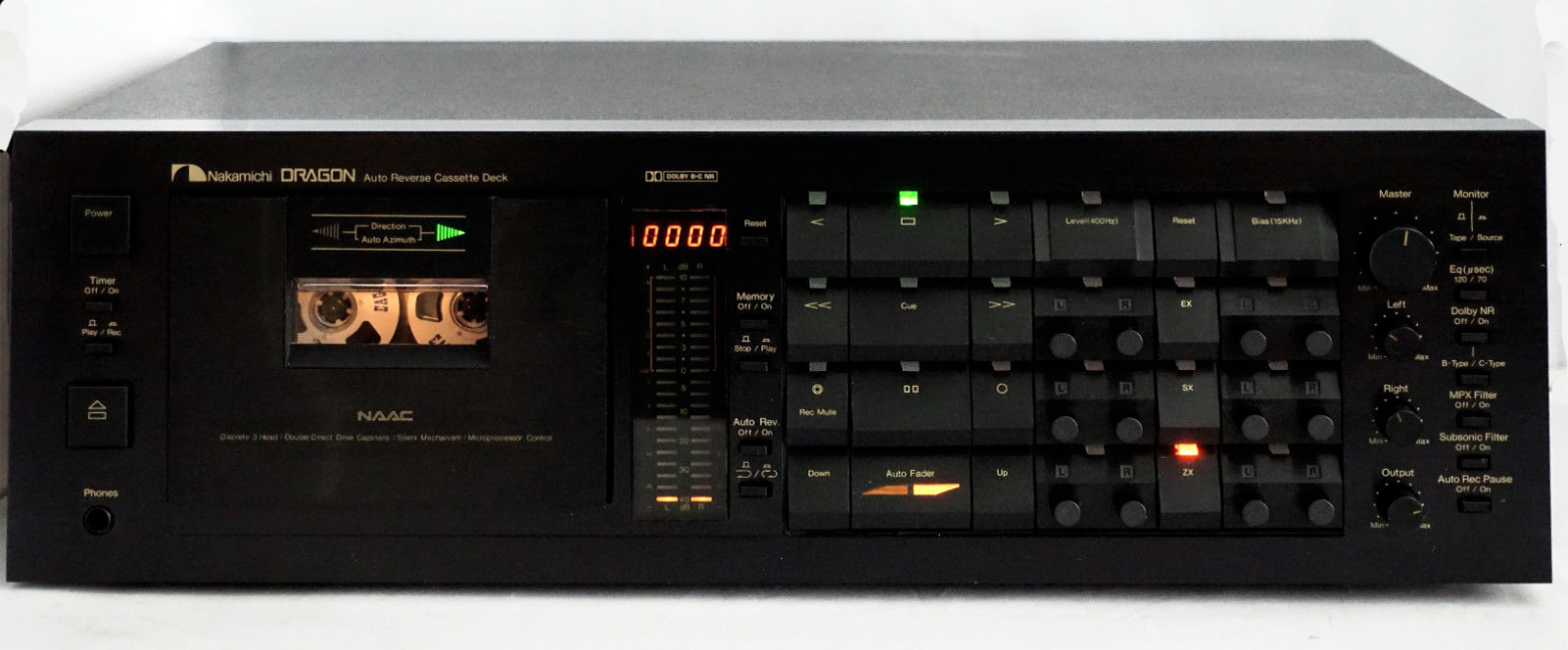
- Manufacturer: Nakamichi
- Designers: Niro Nakamichi; Kozo Kobayashi
- Production period: 1982–1993
- Features: Auto azimuth adjustment Auto reverse replay Manual calibration Dolby B and C

The Nakamichi Dragon is an audio cassette deck that was introduced by Nakamichi in 1982 and marketed until 1994. The Dragon was the first Nakamichi model with bidirectional (Note: The word bidirectional is used instead of autoreversing intentionally, to differentiate ordinary (bidirectional) autoreversing mechanisms from the much rarer unidirectional ones (Akai Invert-o-Matic, Nakamichi UDAR). The latter would actually remove the cassette, flip it over and insert it back.) replay capability and the world's first production tape recorder with an automatic azimuth correction system; this feature, which was invented by Philips engineers and improved by Niro Nakamichi, continuously adjusts the azimuth of the replay head to minimize apparent head skew and correctly reproduce the treble signal present on the tape. The system allows the correct reproduction of mechanically skewed cassettes and recordings made on misaligned decks. Apart from the Dragon, similar systems have only been used in the Nakamichi TD-1200 car cassette player and the Marantz SD-930 cassette deck.

At the time of its introduction, the Dragon had the lowest-ever wow and flutter and the highest-ever dynamic range, losing marginally to the former Nakamichi flagship, the 1000ZXL, in frequency response. Competing models by Sony, Studer, Tandberg and TEAC that were introduced later in the 1980s sometimes surpassed the Dragon in mechanical quality and feature set but none could deliver the same mix of sound quality, flexibility and technological advancement. The Dragon, despite inherent issues with long-term reliability, remained the highest point of compact cassette technology.

== Development and production ==
=== Background ===
Philips introduced the Compact Cassette in 1963. The new format was intended primarily for dictation and had inherent flaws – a low tape speed and narrow track width – that precluded direct competition with vinyl records and reel-to-reel tapes. The cassette shell was designed to accommodate only two heads, ruling out the use of dedicated recording and replay heads (Note: Magnetic gap of a recording head must be wide enough (3 to 5 μm) to impress recording signal into the depth of magnetic layer. The magnetic gap on a replay head must be much narrower; 1μm or less, to reproduce treble frequencies. Combining both requirements in a single recording-replay head inevitably compromised both functions. Nevertheless, two-head designs had advantages; their own relative azimuth error at any point in time was precisely zero and they were not as demanding to production quality as were three-head decks.) and off-tape monitoring that were the norm in reel-to-reel recorders. In 1972, however, Nakamichi introduced a cassette deck that outperformed most domestic and semi-professional reel-to-reel recorders. Ordinary cassette decks of that period struggled to reproduce 12 kHz on ferric tape and 14 kHz on chromium dioxide tape; the Nakamichi 1000 could record and reproduce signals up to 20 kHz on tapes of either type. It was the first three-head cassette deck, the first with discrete (mechanically, magnetically and electrically separate (Note: After weeding out exotic dead-end designs of the early 1970s, the industry settled for so-called sandwiched three-head designs, with recording and replay heads tightly joined in a common case. Completely separate, individually adjustable ('discrete') heads were used only by Nakamichi, Tandberg and Studer in model Revox B710 (but not B215).)) record and replay heads, closed-loop double capstan drive, (Note: Double-capstan tape tensioning was a prerequisite for three-head operation. The problem, once again, stemmed from the design of compact cassette shell. Standard pressure pad could only accommodate one head; squeezing two heads into the same slot required additional tension that could only be achieved with double capstans.) off-tape monitoring, calibration of recording levels and bias, and a convenient manual adjustment of replay head azimuth.

While its competitors struggled to approach the performance of the 1000, Nakamichi continued research and in 1981 presented their next flagship, the 1000ZXL. The new deck has a slightly narrower dynamic range and slightly higher wow and flutter than some competitors, but exceeded them in frequency response and low recording distortion, and was praised for subjective musicality. Its price of US$3,800 was too high for the consumer market; the uprated "gold" version, which was priced at $6,000, became the most expensive cassette deck in history. This was a halo model, a vehicle for selling the company's numerous less expensive decks. Although Nakamichi released several models with experimental functionality, (Note: In late 1970s Nakamichi co-financed development of High Com noise reduction and manufactured standalone High Com processors. In 1979 Nakamichi released dual-speed cassette decks 680 and 680ZX, with an optional slow speed of 2.38 cm/s (other manufacturers of dual-speed decks used faster speed of 9.7 cm/s).) overall the company's approach to design was conservative. All models below the 1000 and 700 series followed the same general design and used the same dual-capstan transport that was introduced in 1978. Nakamichi consistently refrained from copying its competitors' latest solutions and features, refused to employ adaptive biasing and Dolby S, and did not make autoreversing decks until introduction of the Dragon. Autoreversing was desirable but bidirectional autoreversing tape transports of the 1970s suffered from inherent head azimuth instability, which caused irrecoverable treble roll-off. This issue had to be resolved before attempting to build a true high-fidelity autoreversing deck.

=== Azimuth problem ===
Treble loss as a function of frequency and azimuth error

Replay head skew (absolute azimuth error)

Tape skew (absolute azimuth error)

Recorded signal skew (relative azimuth error)

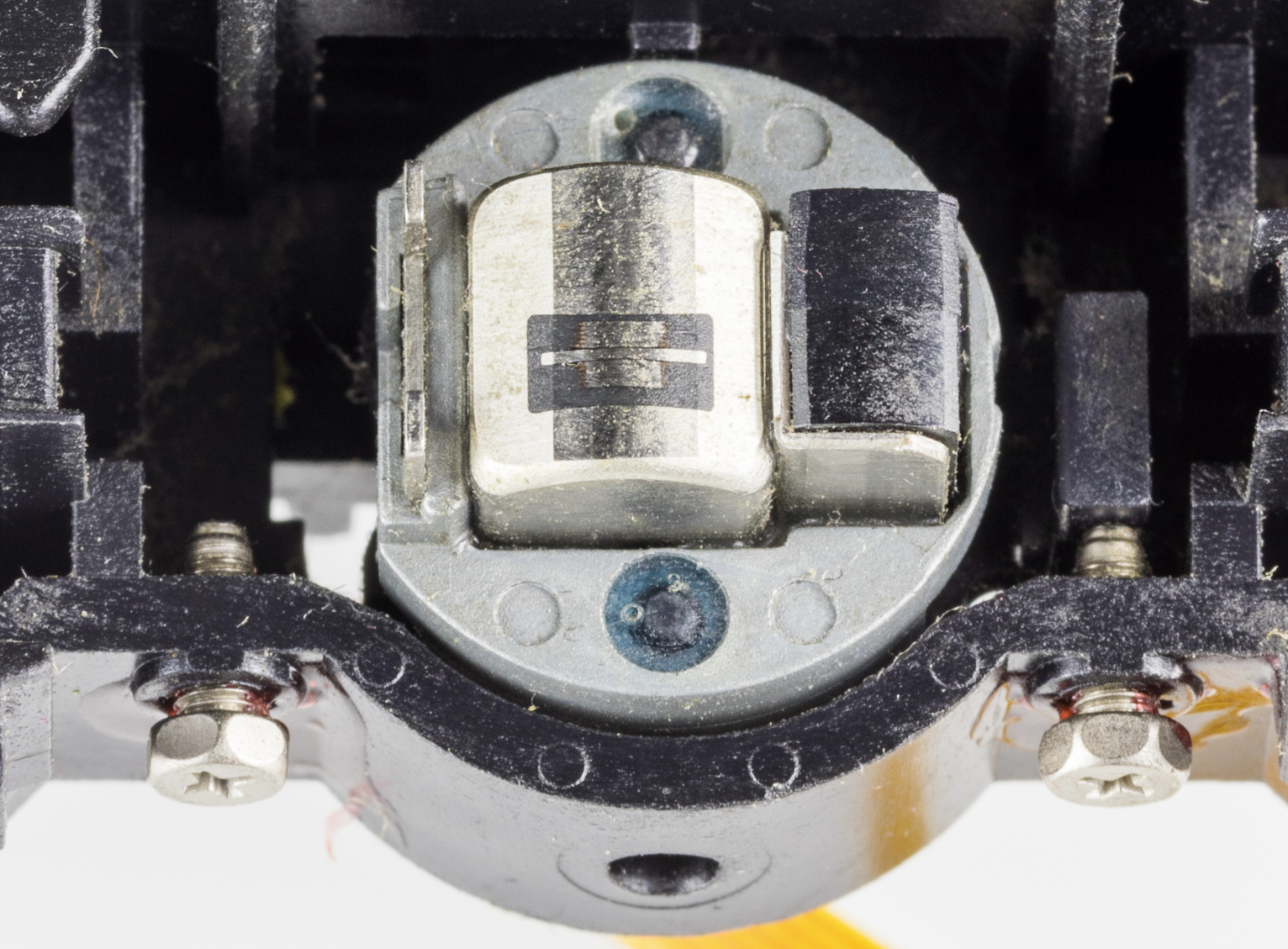
Rotating two-head assembly of a bidirectional recorder

In magnetic recording, "azimuth" denotes the orientation of the magnetic head gap – a narrow, vertical slit that spans the height of the track – with respect to the direction of tape travel. "Absolute azimuth", the angle between the gap and the direction of tape travel, must be set at precisely ninety degrees for correct replay of treble signals. In practice, the main goal is perfecting the "relative azimuth" – the angle between the recording and replay magnetic gaps, which must be as low as possible. A two-head deck, in theory, has zero relative azimuth at a given point in time but in the long term its absolute azimuth drifts away from ninety degrees. The advantage disappears when a two-head deck replays tapes recorded on equipment with an unknown absolute azimuth error.

External videos
- Unidirectional auto reverse transports
- Philips, 1972
- Akai Invert-o-Matic, 1972
- Nakamichi UDAR, 1984

Azimuth errors, or tape skew, affect cassette decks much more than reel-to-reel tape recorders running at higher speeds. A cassette deck claiming a frequency response up to 20 kHz must have an azimuth error less than 6' (arc minutes). Above this threshold, losses in high-frequency response steeply rise; at 20' the head is practically unable to reproduce any treble. These losses cannot be recovered with conventional analog filters. Another inherent drawback of cassettes is the instability of tape positioning relative to the mechanism. The direction of tape travel often deviates from the deck's plane of reference. Sometimes a cassette will play acceptably in one direction but not the other; sometimes azimuth error will audibly vary as the tape plays. Mechanical improvements in tape transport cannot remedy this problem because it stems from minor defects and wear of the cassette shell.

Bidirectional autoreversing cassette tape transports are particularly prone to azimuth errors. Simple transports that use fixed four-track replay heads – the industry standard for car and personal stereos – can be properly aligned in one direction only, leaving the other direction vulnerable to unpredictable random errors. Transports that use rotating two-head assemblies were usually equipped with independent alignment screws for forward and reverse directions. Rotation, however, subjects heads to mechanical stresses that quickly cause audible azimuth errors. Rotating assemblies cannot physically fit separate recording and replay heads; this drawback limits fidelity and rules out tape-source monitoring and tape calibration functionality. The third, more flexible alternative is unidirectional transports that reverse tapes by physically flipping the cassette. Philips and Akai tested this approach in the early 1970s and it was abandoned until the introduction of Nakamichi UDAR (Unidirectional Auto Reverse) decks in 1984.

=== Search for solution ===
Rijckaert - de Niet azimuth correction method (1978 patent)

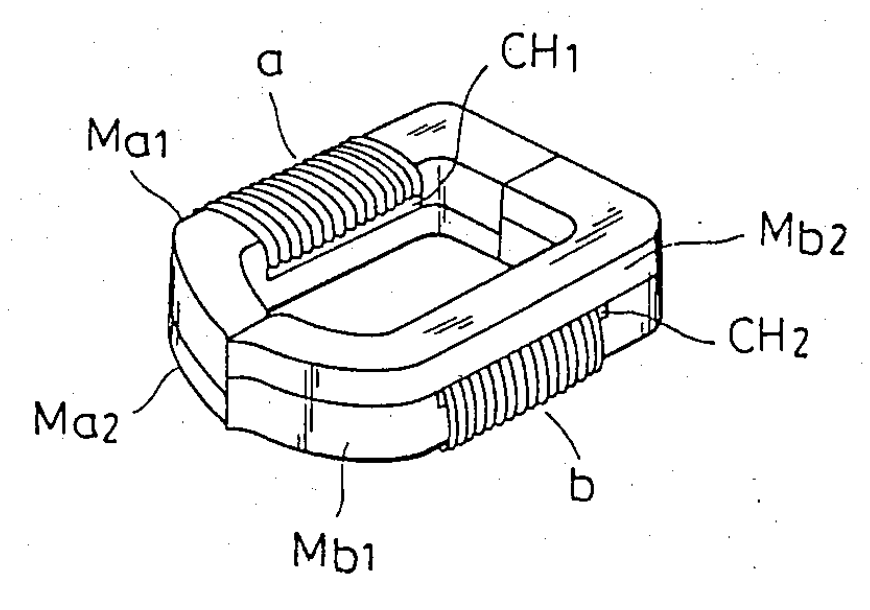
Nakamichi replay head, isometric view (1982 patent)

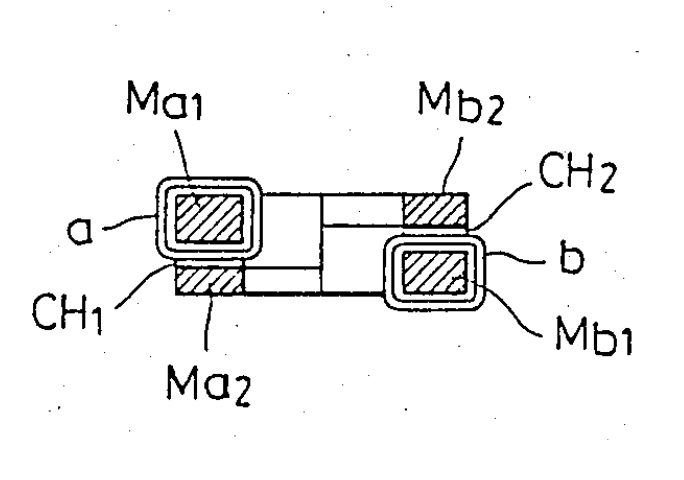
Nakamichi replay head, cross-section (1982 patent)

Nakamichi Dragon replay head configuration (1982)

Marantz SD-930 replay head configuration (1983)

In 1976, (Note: Dates in this section are priority dates of respective patents in the original country of registration.) John Jenkins of International Tapetronics (Note: International Tapetronics (ITC), also known as American Tapetronics (ATC), manufactured professional Fidelipac cartridge player for radio and television since 1958. John Jenkins, a co-founder of ITC, adapted the George Eash cartridge to professional requirements. In 1981 ITC became a subsidiary of 3M, in 1990 3M sold ITC to investors from Canada. By the end of the 1990s the business died, the cartridge players were superseded by digital audio players.) invented a novel azimuth correction system for multitrack studio recorders. Two outermost tracks of the Jenkins recorder were reserved for the reference sine wave signal. With properly aligned heads, two sine waves recorded in phase should also replay in phase. If the replay head is skewed, the output sine waves will differ in phase. A DC motor governed by a servo regulator continuously adjusts the azimuth of the replay head to minimize the difference between two signals. Thus, claimed Jenkins, his recorder was able to compensate for replay azimuth skew of any nature.

In 1978, Albert Rijckaert and Edmond de Niet of Philips patented an azimuth correction method that did not require dedicated reference tracks and could be retrofitted to any existing recording format. Its inventors proposed splitting each channel of the replay head into two half-width sub-channels; one magnetic subsystem would read the upper half of the track and the other would read the lower half, and the difference between their outputs would comprise the error signal. The system would work if and when the recorded signal has enough treble content; it would not work reliably with recordings with very little treble content and would not work at all with blank tapes. One year later, Rijckaert and de Niet patented a complete azimuth control system. Their servomechanism used a piezoelectric transducer and functioned in a manner similar to the device described in Jenkins' patent.

A practical, production-ready design of the Rijckaert – de Niet head for cassette recorders was patented by Niro Nakamichi in November 1981. Fitting two replay sub-channels into 0,6 mm of a cassette track was a challenging task; according to the patent, each of two cores had to be made up of 0.2 mm (0.0079 in) and 0.4 mm (0.016 in) thick lamination stacks; the windings had to be hidden in narrow grooves cut into the sides of the thickest stacks. The patented servo system, which was soon commercialized as the Nakamichi Auto Azimuth Correction (NAAC), analyzed only treble signals in the 2–8 kHz range; the deadband of the control loop was set with a simple diode limiter. The servomechanism was driven by an electric motor and used a complex gear train terminating in a wedge that pushed the pivoting replay head.

Unlike the Rijckaert – de Niet system, the NAAC analyzed only the innermost (right) channel of a stereo tape. The outermost (left) channel should have been reproduced with a conventional full-track magnetic system. According to Nakamichi, the left channel of a cassette tape is more prone to dropouts and wear, and should not be used for extracting azimuth information; as a side benefit, a simplified control loop has to deal with only one error signal. A unidirectional, azimuth-sensing head would employ three magnetic subsystems – one full-track and two half-track – a bidirectional NAAC replay head would employ six. Bidirectional recording was not an option because a fixed, pivoting replay head would require two erase heads and two recording heads – too many for the limited space of the cassette tape guide. Niro Nakamichi and Kozo Kobayashi, lead designer of the Dragon, settled for a conventional three-head configuration with unidirectional recording only.

=== Introduction ===
External videos
- Tape decks with auto azimuth correction
- Nakamichi Dragon
- Marantz SD-930
- Nakamichi TD-1200

The Nakamichi Dragon, the first production cassette deck built around Rijckaert – de Niet and Niro Nakamichis's inventions, was introduced in North America in November 1982. At a price of US$1,850, it replaced the far more expensive and already discontinued Nakamichi 1000ZXL as the company's flagship model. The name Dragon broke Nakamichi's tradition of using plain numeric model codes and was coined by company founder Etsuro Nakamichi, who died in the same month.

The deck was well-received by the press, scoring far above the competition. It became the new reference against which all competition was judged and remained so until the end of production. Competing products dubbed "Dragon slayers" of the late 1980s like Revox B215 or Tandberg 3014 or the flagship TEACs surpassed the Dragon in mechanical quality or functionality, but no one could beat it altogether. The combination of sound quality, function set and technology attained by Nakamichi in 1982 remained the apex of the cassette deck industry.

The only other auto-azimuth deck was released in 1983 by Marantz, which was then a Japanese subsidiary of Philips. The Marantz SD-930 had a unidirectional, three-head tape transport, a stereo azimuth-sensing replay head with four magnetic subsystems, and the proprietary Marantz Auto Azimuth Correction (MAAC) servomechanism with a piezoelectric actuator. It was manufactured for a short time in small numbers and remained almost unknown to the audiophile community and the press. In 1985, it was examined and tested by the German magazine Audio, which ranked it the worst of eight competing products.

=== Later years ===
External videos
- Direct competitors
- ASC 3000
- Harman-Kardon CD491
- Revox B215
- Tandberg 3014

In 1985, Nakamichi attempted to develop the Dragon marque into a premium sub-brand and released the Nakamichi Dragon-CT turntable, but no cassette decks named Dragon ever followed the original model. Manufacturing and aftermarket servicing of azimuth-sensing heads and transports was too expensive and too difficult, even for the company that invented them. After the Dragon, Nakamichi released only one NAAC-equipped model, the TD-1200 car stereo. The 'junior' line of Nakamichi autoreversing decks that was released from 1983 to 1985 used unidirectional transports that physically flipped the cassette but lacked azimuth correction. The 1986 Nakamichi CR-7, a new flagship deck that was manufactured alongside the Dragon, had a unidirectional transport with manual azimuth controls.

By 1988, development of high-end cassette decks had ended. These models were a concession to a small number of enthusiasts; too few to make any profits. Their value as halo drivers for selling low-cost consumer decks quickly eroded with the spread of digital technologies. Any further improvements in analog tape equipment, if possible at all, required substantial research expense but by that time, corporate resources were already committed to digital. In 1990, Nakamichi outsourced transport manufacturing to Sankyo and discontinued all models built around Nakamichi's own unidirectional tape transports.

Despite all setbacks, the original Dragon remained in production until 1993 and sales in Japan continued at least into 1994. The number of manufactured Dragons remains undisclosed but considering the eleven-year production run and worldwide sales network, it was very large for a halo product. By 1996, rising costs of Japanese labor and a declining market forced Nakamichi to shut down cassette deck production. The company made a mistake by focusing all efforts on Digital Audio Tape (DAT), which failed to gain a substantial market presence, and in 1997 the Nakamichi family sold the dying business to Grande Holdings.

== Design features ==
=== Appearance and ergonomics ===
The Dragon faceplate, which descending from models ZX-7 and ZX-9, differs from them in the arrangement of secondary controls and recording level meter. The Dragon's oversized transport and calibration control buttons are arranged in rows like Dragon scales, and acquired a three-dimensional profile. The Dragon has a well-developed calibration panel and automated fader but otherwise its function set is minimal, assuming fully manual operation. Tape selection is manual with independent settings for bias and equalization (EQ); this allows the deck to record on Type II and Type IV tapes with 120 μs time constant. Reviewers rated the Dragon ergonomics positively but noted many minor quirks and inconveniences. They said the deep window of the cassette well is too small; the right-side buttons – including the noise reduction and EQ switches – are too small and hard to read but easy to press accidentally. The resolution of the LED meter, like that of all segmented displays, is too coarse for precise adjustment. Nakamichi continued its tradition of giving cryptic names to standard tape types (EX, SX and ZX for Types I, II and IV, respectively).

Recording channel calibration is performed separately for left and right channels in a sequence similar to that of the ZX-7 and ZX-9, except on the Dragon, the optimal relative azimuth is set automatically by the NAAC. Once the NAAC reaches equilibrium, which takes up to 15 seconds, the user aligns recording channel gain ("level") to match the tape's sensitivity using a 400 Hz test tone. Then, the user aligns the bias using 15 kHz test tone. Reviewers noted the manual calibration on the Dragon was as good as the automatic systems of its competitors. Manual process takes more time but allows control over frequency response to suit the user's taste. Calibration, however, cannot remedy faults of low-grade ferric tape, which, according to Robertson, "would be bad choices for the Dragon anyway".

=== Tape transport ===
Nakamichi designers always followed the philosophy: "performance first, convenience second". This approach led them to adopt a discrete, three-head layout with independently adjustable recording and replay heads, while the rest of the industry adopted tightly joined head assemblies. Next, they created a robust, double-capstan, "diffused resonance" tape transport and Nakamichi's pressure pad lifter – a tiny improvement that substantially reduced scrape flutter and modulation noise. Another innovation in the Dragon was direct drive of both capstans using low-cogging, brushless DC motors. Capstans traditionally had unequal diameters and different flywheel masses. The speeds of the quartz-controlled capstans were spread apart to ensure the trailing (braking) capstan always lagged behind the leading capstan by 0.2%, in either forward or reverse mode, to properly tension the tape and isolate it from the cassette shell. The third motor spun both tape spools, the fourth motor drove the NAAC servo, and the fifth one smoothly raised and lowered the head assembly in place of the usual solenoid). Both pinch rollers were enclosed in wraparound tape-guide blocks; ordinary unidirectional decks with double-capstan transports had only one such block. A side benefit of the Dragon's complex, five-motor arrangement was that the transport, except for the tape counter, did not use belts or springs.

The Dragon's discrete – mechanically, electrically and magnetically independent – heads were rated for 10,000 hours of replay or recording. To prevent early formation of a wear groove, which usually destroys the left channel audio, the heads were pre-slotted at the tape edges. This standard feature of reel-to-reel studio recorders had never been used in cassette decks before. The cores of the recording and replay heads were made of Nakamichi's "crystalloy", and the double-gapped erase head used a ferrite and sendust core. The two-track recording head has a gap of 3.5 μm and the four-track, six-channel replay head has a gap of 0.6 μm; theoretically, the latter allows reproduction of frequencies up to 40 kHz.

Nakamichi auto azimuth correction (NAAC) operates continuously in either replay or recording mode and is able to correct azimuth errors of up to 12 arc minutes. The NAAC has no memory: each tape eject and each change of replay direction erases the current setting and returns the replay head to its default position. The system is reactivated immediately upon pressing the play button. The head remains stationary if the detected azimuth error lies within the deadband limits; higher error values engage servomechanism action. When the recorded signal has sufficient content, head alignment to 1 arc-minute precision takes from 1 to 5 seconds and usually remains unnoticed by the listener. If the recorded signal contains very little high-frequency energy, the system detects uncertainty and slows down or does not engage at all. NAAC is not completely foolproof; it can be confused and disturbed by unusually strong ultrasonic signals and very fast audio-frequency sweeps. Such unnatural, non-musical signals cause "some hunting" as the NAAC tries to seek a nonexistent or quickly changing target.

=== Audio signal path ===
The Dragon's replay audio path has six identical head amplifiers; two for forward direction, two for reverse, and two for the NAAC control channel – one each for forward and reverse. Each head amplifier is an active filter using a discrete JFET front stage that is AC-coupled to an operational amplifier (op amp) in inverting configuration. This was the first time Nakamichi used op amps rather than discrete transistors in head amplifiers. Their feedback networks shape low and middle-frequency parts of the IEC equalization curve, and crudely approximate its treble part. The signal then passes through CMOS switches that select either forward or reverse channels and is then routed to noise reduction integrated circuits (IC), where the treble equalization at either 120 μs or 70 μs is completed. The Dolby B/C compander is a true "double Dolby" compander with two NE652 ICs in the replay path and two more in the recording path. A similar arrangement, excluding bidirectional replay features, was later used in Nakamichi CR-7. The Dragon's recording path, traditionally for upper-range Nakamichi decks, has individual analog bias adjustment and no Dolby HX Pro or any other kind of dynamic biasing.

== Reception and reviews ==
=== Independent measurements ===
The Dragon's wow and flutter announced by Nakamichi – 0.019% weighted RMS and 0.04% weighted peak – were twice as low as those of Nakamichi 1000ZXL and, for a while, the lowest on the market. Independent tests confirmed the manufacturer's figures; according to Stereo Review, test results revealed the performance of the equipment that recorded the test tape rather than that of the Dragon. In the late 1980s ASC, (Note: ASC (Audio System Components) was a small German manufacturer of high fidelity domestic equipment, better known for their reel-to-reel recorders based on Braun platforms. After the demise of the high-fidelity industry, the company switched to industrial data recording services and, as of 2020, is still in business as ASC Technologies AG.) Onkyo, Studer and TEAC reached a similar level of wow and flutter but the Dragon's achievement was still the best in industry. Long-term speed stability of the Dragon was exemplary but that was typical for quartz-controlled transports. The Dragon's absolute speed error (+0.2–+0.5%) was typical for the industry and presented no audible distraction. (Note: Manufacturers intentionally made new decks +0.2–0.5% faster than standard. As the decks aged, capstan wear gradually reduced speed back to standard. Small increases in speed were deemed far less detrimental than small decreases.)

According to Stereo Review's measurements, the Dragon's dynamic range for Type I, II and IV tapes equaled 54, 56.5 and 59 decibels (dB) respectively. These were record-high figures for cassette machines, beating the Tandberg 3014 and the Revox B215 in comparative tests by 4-5 dB. The Dragon's replay audio path generated far less treble noise; tape hiss reproduced with the Dragon appeared subjectively quieter and euphonic. Maximum output levels (MOL) of the Dragon were also the best in class, marginally better than those of the Tandberg but almost 4 dB better than those of the Revox.

The lower boundary of the Dragon's frequency response, measured to within ±3 dB, extends to 11–12 Hz. Nakamichi said the special shape of their heads substantially reduced the contour effect, (Note: Contour effect takes place at very low frequencies, when wavelength of the recorded signal approaches the physical length of the magnetic core. Contour effect causes resonant dips and peaks, called head bumps, in frequency response. Head bumps are very prominent in professional recorders running at high speeds; at 4.76 cm/s they usually lie well below 20 Hz and may be ignored. However, use of very small magnetic heads may shift them up into audible frequencies.) effectively suppressing low-frequency headbump (poletip resonance). This is only true for the replay head. The combined recording and replay frequency response, according to independent testers, exhibits a comb-like resonant pattern. The lowest and most prominent peak or headbump, which lies at around 15 Hz, can be suppressed with a user-defeatable subsonic filter.

The upper boundary for low-level (-20 dB) signals extends to 22–24 kHz depending on tape type. This is much lower than the record set by the Nakamichi 1000ZXL (26–28 kHz), and is typical for all flagship models of the 1980s. The significance of this parameter was often overstated by hi-fi enthusiasts; professionals did not rate it as important because any professional deck easily exceeded the 20 kHz mark. More important was the high-level frequency response, which is largely limited by the tape and tape-head interaction. Here, the Dragon demonstrated very good performance, marginally better than Tandberg and significantly better than the Revox with Type I and Type IV (but not Type II) tapes.

=== Controversy about equalization ===
Reviewers who examined the Dragon's frequency response noted its abnormal behavior in the upper treble. The Dragon played back test tapes with a prominent treble boost, reaching +4 dB at 18 kHz. This would audibly brighten up music recorded on standard equipment. Noel Keywood wrote that Dragon's brightness would benefit most tapes recorded on inferior decks but might be annoying or unpleasant at times.

The treble boost of Nakamichi's cassette decks was well known to the press before the advent of the Dragon; it had been discussed in American journals in 1981 and 1982. The root of the problem was hidden in the language of the IEC standard enacted in 1978 and based on the original, outdated 1963 Philips specification. The standard was written in terms of remanent magnetic flux (Note: The IEC defined short-circuit flux of a magnetic recording as "the flux which flows through the core of a reproducing head which has zero reluctance and is in intimate contact with the surface of the tape over an infinite length". The definition describes a perfect, ideal head with no core losses ("zero reluctance"), no spacing losses ("intimate contact") and no low-frequency head bump or contour effect ("infinite length").) recorded on tape. Flux, the principal metric of recorded signals, cannot be directly measured; it can only be picked up with a magnetic head, which converts the faint magnetic field into electric current, losing some energy in the process of conversion. Replay head losses rise with frequency and cannot usually be reliably calculated due to the complexity of underlying phenomena.

To make things easier for the industry, the IEC tacitly allowed manufacturers to use the output of the IEC reference replay head as the definitive measure of the recorded signal. Losses in the reference head had to be compensated for with a reciprocal treble boost during recording. This arrangement became a norm in the industry but was never properly formalized. By 1981, improvements in tape head technology made the IEC reference head obsolete; new, top-of-the-line replay heads had far lower treble losses and did not need as much pre-emphasis. Test tapes, however, were routinely made to suit the old reference head. Overall, test-tape production was in disarray, which worsened compatibility issues. Classic Philips calibration tapes were technologically obsolete and samples were inconsistent. New TDK tapes were even less consistent and differed from Philips tapes, while TEAC tapes were different from those from both Philips and TDK. All test tapes were recorded with undocumented pre-emphasis and with a slightly different azimuth.

Nakamichi never subscribed to the informal industry convention but followed the Philips and IEC standards literally, and insisted losses in the replay head must be compensated for in the replay chain. Pre-emphasis in the recording chain should only compensate for recording losses; according to Nakamichi, anything else was unacceptable. The company insisted estimation of treble losses in well-engineered heads presents no problems. As a result, Nakamichi's recording chains and calibration tapes were consistently duller than those of the competition and Nakamichi's replay chains were consistently brighter. This difference was gradually fading as the company's competitors gradually improved their own replay heads and tacitly adopted Nakamichi's approach. BASF, a principal player in the IEC and manufacturer of the IEC Type I and Type II reference tapes, backed Nakamichi with a statement saying that, as of December 1981, Nakamichi decks were fully compatible with BASF-made reference tapes.

=== Overall ratings ===
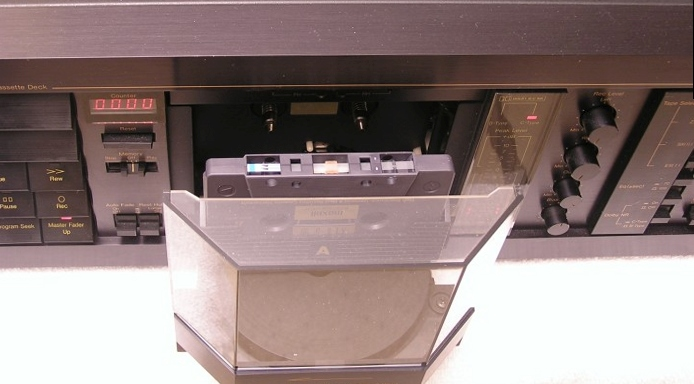
The next generation of Nakamichi auto-reverse decks, introduced in 1984, used unidirectional transports that flipped over the cassette, rather than reversing.

Throughout the 1980s, high fidelity magazines called the Nakamichi Dragon the best cassette deck they had ever tested. In comparative tests by Audio (West Germany, 1985) and Stereo Review (United States, 1988), only the Revox B215 equaled the Dragon in sound quality. The Revox surpassed the Dragon in mechanical aspects and probably in long-term durability but lacked auto-reverse, automatic azimuth adjustment and the versatility of manual calibration. Flagship decks by ASC, Harman Kardon, Onkyo, Tandberg and TEAC, and the auto-azimuth Marantz SD-930, were distinctly inferior to the Dragon. The Dragon's status as Nakamichi's best deck is debatable. According to Paul Wilkins of Bowers & Wilkins – long-term Nakamichi distributor and service provider – the 1000ZXL is the most complicated and rarest model, the less expensive CR-7 is equivalent to the Dragon in terms of sound quality but lacks auto-reverse and auto-azimuth functions.

These functions, particularly auto-azimuth, changed the market in favor of the Dragon. It was not just another precision recording machine; it was a player that could adapt to almost any cassette recorded on almost any other deck. This attracted affluent yuppie buyers and sealed the Dragon's reputation as a desirable status symbol. In the late 1990s, after Nakamichi failed, the company's products acquired cult status. Barry Wilson of Stereophile compared Nakamichi to the status of Harley-Davidson among motorcyclists and the Gibson Les Paul among guitarists. McIntosh amplifiers and Linn turntables were just as desirable but Nakamichi's number of loyal owners exceeded both. Worldwide sales figures for the Dragon are unknown but around 130,000 Nakamichi decks were sold in the United Kingdom alone By 1998, Nakamichi fans had already formed vibrant internet communities; their online activity disseminated and reinforced the belief in the "legendary Nakamichi warmth". The Dragon was revered as "the Holy Grail of what could be accomplished at 1 7/8" – the tape speed of the cassette.

In the 21st century, the reputation of the Dragon has been reinforced by collectors, internet traders and a few repair technicians. Critics say the legend of the Dragon did not pass the test of time. The complex, five-motor transport, which was once hailed as "a masterpiece of engineering" and an "engineering tour de force", was not as robust as simpler, unidirectional transports. The Dragons that are sold at internet auctions need extensive repairs; the small number of Nakamichi service technicians is shrinking and parts must be scavenged from non-functional Dragons. The cost of a complete overhaul in 2014 was comparable with the price of a new deck in the 1990s.

== Sources ==
- Burstein, Herman (1984). "How Important is Azimuth?". Audio (September): 40–43, 45–46.
- Hoff, Philip (1998). Consumer Electronics for Engineers. Wiley Series in Practical Strategy. Cambridge University Press. ISBN 9780521588171.
- Jones, Doug; Manquen, Dale (2008). "Chapter 28. Magnetic Recording and Playback". Handbook for Sound Engineers, Fourth Edition. Focal Press / Elsevier. ISBN 9780240809694.
- Kimizuka, Masanori (2012). "Historical Development of Magnetic Recording and Tape Recorder" (PDF). National Museum of Nature and Science. Survey Reports on the Systemization of Technologies. 17 (August): 185–275.
- Mallinson, John C. (2012). The Foundations of Magnetic Recording. Elsevier. ISBN 9780080506821.
- Roberson, Howard (1984). "Compatibility in Tape Decks". Audio (September): 44–45.
- Rumsey, Francis; McCormick, Tim (2006). Sound and Recording: An Introduction. Taylor and Francis. ISBN 9780240519968.
- Stark, Craig (1984a). "Tape Equipment: State of the Art". Stereo Review (March): 44–48.
- Watkinson, John (2012). The Art of Sound Reproduction. CRC Press. ISBN 9781136118548.
- Козюренко, Ю. И. (1998). Современные магнитофоны, плееры, диктофоны и наушники [Modern tape recorders, players, dictation machines and headphones] (in Russian). ДМК. ISBN 5898180087.

=== Reviews and comparative tests ===
- Berger, I. (1982). "The World's Most Expensive Cassette Deck". Audio (September): 42–43.
- Eisenberg, Norman; Feldman, Len (1981). "Nakamichi 1000 ZXL Cassette Recorder". Modern Recording and Music. 6 (9): 69–75.
- Feldman, Len (1983). "Nakamichi Dragon Cassette Deck". Modern Recording and Music (April): 46–53.
- Feldman, Len (1986). "The Revox B215 — An Elegant Cassette Deck From Swiss Craftsmen". Modern Electronics (June): 15–20.
- Keywood, Noel (1986). "Nakamichi Dragon". Hi-Fi Choice (UK). 47.
- Keywood, Noel (1987a). "Nakamichi Dragon". Hi-Fi Review Buying Guide (UK): 72.
- Keywood, Noel (1987b). "Nakamichi CR-7". Hi-Fi Review Buying Guide (UK): 70–71.
- Roberson, Howard (1983). "Nakamichi Dragon Cassette Deck". Audio (May): 66–70.
- Roberson, Howard (1982). "Nakamichi ZX-7 Cassette Deck". Audio (May): 54–57.
- Stark, Craig (1983). "Nakamichi Dragon Cassette Deck". Stereo Review (April): 38–40.
- Stark, Craig (1984b). "Nakamichi Dragon". Stereo Review Tape Recording and Buying Guide: 40–42.
- Stark, Craig (1988). "5 Top Tape Decks". Stereo Review (March): 52–58.
- Feld, Wolfgang (1985). "Alle mal herhören. Vergleichsest: acht Rekorder von 2000 bis 4500 Mark" [Everybody Listen: Comparative test of eight recorders from 2000 to 4500 [West German] Marks]. Audio (Germany) (in German) (Juni): 78–84.

=== Nakamichi publications ===
- Nakamichi Dragon Auto-Reverse Cassette Deck (publicity brochure). Nakamichi Corporation. 1982.
- Nakamichi Dragon Auto-Reverse Cassette Deck. Owner's Manual. Nakamichi Corporation. 1982.
- Nakamichi Dragon Auto-Reverse Cassette Deck. Service Manual. Nakamichi Corporation. 1982.
- Nakamichi Cassette Equalization: The Standard View. Nakamichi. 1982. A collection of reprints from the press and original statements by Nakamichi and BASF staff:
  - "Playback Equalisation". Nakamichi Technical Bulletin (2). 1981.
  - Foster, Ed (1981). "Cassette equalization: the standard view". Audio Video International (Japan - USA) (December).
  - Long, Robert (1982). "The High Price of Progress". High Fidelity (February).
  - Ohba, Ken (1982). "Talk Back: The Flux in the Crux". Modern Recording and Music (January).
  - O'Kelly, Terence (1981). "Letter to the editor of Modern Recording and Music". Nakamichi Cassette Equalization: The Standard View. Nakamichi.
- Nakamichi CR-7A Discrete Head Cassette Deck (publicity brochure). Nakamichi Corporation. 1986.
- Nakamichi CR-7A / CR-5A / CR-7 / CR-5 Discrete Head Cassette Deck. Owner's Manual. Nakamichi Corporation. 1986.
- Nakamichi CR-7A / CR-5A / CR-7 / CR-5 Discrete Head Cassette Deck. Service Manual. Nakamichi Corporation. 1986.
