= Adaptive biasing =

Methods to improve tape performance by adjusting input bias

In magnetic tape recording, adaptive biasing is the technique of continuously varying the bias current to a recording head in accordance with the level of high-frequency audio signals. With adaptive biasing, high levels of high-frequency audio signals cause a proportionate decrease in bias current using either feedforward or preferably a negative feedback control system. Compared with the use of fixed bias current, adaptive biasing provides a higher maximum output level and higher dynamic range at the upper end of the audible spectrum and to a lesser extent, mid-range frequencies. The effect of adaptive biasing is most pronounced in compact cassette and low-speed reel-to-reel media. The first commercial implementation, the feedforward system Dolby HX was developed by Dolby Laboratories by 1979 and was rejected by the industry. The subsequent negative-feedback system Dolby HX Pro was developed by Bang & Olufsen and marketed by Dolby, and became the de facto standard of the consumer high fidelity industry in the mid-1980s.

== Fixed and adaptive biasing ==
Simplified graphic explanation of the adaptive biasing principle. The shown magnetization curves (top) and bias control curve (bottom) are valid only at treble frequencies. The exact values of the breakpoints and slopes vary with frequency.

Tape bias is a strong, high-frequency, alternating current that is fed to a tape recording head along with the audio signal with the purpose of making more linear the inherently non-linear response of the magnetic particles in the tape's magnetic coating. The frequency of the bias signal in consumer cassette decks is usually fixed at between 80 and 100 kHz. The quality of the bias signal is critical because noise, hum and direct current in the bias severely degrade audio fidelity. The level of the bias signal defines the slope and shape of the resulting magnetization curve.

The optimal bias level for each tape formulation is a compromise between maximum output levels, noise, distortion and frequency response. Nominal bias, corresponding to maximum sensitivity and/or maximum output at 10 kHz, is less desirable for mid-range frequencies. Over-biasing is better suited for mid-range and low frequencies but it reduces tape sensitivity at higher frequencies and degrades the signal-to-noise ratio. As a side benefit, optimum bias improves the response to tape dropouts because stronger magnetic fields penetrate more deeply into the magnetic coating. Under-biasing causes excessive distortion and modulation noise, and raises the susceptibility to dropouts, and is thus unwanted. In practice, tape is always slightly over biased; the optimal bias current is set at two or three decibels (dB) above the nominal value. This optimal setting improves linearity at mid-range frequencies but reduces dynamic range and causes a drop in high-frequency response, which is offset with pre-emphasis in the recording chain.

Recording very low wavelengths at tape speeds of 4.76 cm/s (1.87 in/s) and 9.53 cm/s (3.75 in/s) presents another challenge. Audible high-frequency components of the recorded signal act as biasing currents, resulting in excessive over-biasing that manifests itself in dynamic range compression and early onset of saturation at high frequencies, especially when recording on low quality tapes with low saturation levels. In the 1970s, music typically published on vinyl records or transmitted on FM radio did not contain much high-frequency energy and usually could not drive the tape into saturation. The digitally mastered, direct-to-disc and disco recordings of the late 1970s and early 1980s, however, often contain enough high-frequency information, or "hot" treble, to trigger tape overload.

In the late 1970s, the recording industry proposed three solutions to the problem. Metal particle tapes had very high maximum output levels and treble saturation levels but were prohibitively expensive for most home users. The early metal tapes had high absolute level of hiss and there were fears metal tape would quickly degrade but this did not happen. The second solution was developed independently by Tandberg and Akai, and relied on limiting recording levels. The patented Tandberg Dyneq and Akai ADRS circuits electronically compressed the signal before it could overload the tape. In 1979, Kenneth James Gundry of Dolby Laboratories proposed the third alternative; adapting the bias current to the treble content of the source signal. The increase in high-frequency energy, which effectively overbiases the tape, would be compensated for with a reciprocal decrease in the output of the bias generator.

The effect of such compensation is evident from the typical magnetization curves. By default, when the source signal's treble energy is low, the recorder operates at a fixed optimal bias current I_{b.opt.} (blue curve). Initial over-biasing assures good linearity but low sensitivity and low saturation levels. Reduced bias current value of I_{b.red.} allows operation at higher input and output levels, albeit with a higher sensitivity (red curve). A well-designed adaptively biased circuit must gradually decrease bias current so the increase in sensitivity compensates for the saturation effects. The new, adaptive magnetization curve remains straight (green dotted line) to the maximum recording current I_{af.1}. Owing to self-biasing effects, distortion at middle frequencies remains low and intermodulation decreases.

The location of the breakpoint I_{af.o} on the control curve and the slope of its high-level segment depend on the frequency of the input signal, and the energy-loss mechanisms in the tape and the recording head. A practical adaptive-biasing system must employ heuristic weighing over the treble frequencies to attain the best performance of a specific recorder. The effect of changes in tape formulations is insignificant in the case of ferric tapes. Different tapes require different optimal bias settings but the bias control curve can be identical for all ferric tapes.

== Dolby HX ==
The original Dolby HX (for 'Headroom eXtension') designed by Gundry for Dolby Laboratories operated as an add-on to the Dolby B noise-reduction encoder. The Dolby B integrated circuit (IC) extracts the envelope of the mid-frequency and treble components of the source signals and uses it to modulate the gain of its side channel. The HX circuit blends together the envelope signals of both stereo channels. The composite envelope modulates the output of a voltage source that powers the common erase/bias generator, thus varying the bias current. Simultaneously, the same envelope modulates the level of high-frequency pre-emphasis of the two recording channels. Controlling both stereo channels with a single bias modulator was deemed acceptable due to the high degree of correlation between the left and right stereo signals, and the poor channel separation of the existing analog sources available to the consumer. Controlling erase and bias currents simultaneously could cause sudden drops in the effectiveness of erasure but this only happened during the loudest passages with much treble content, which was sufficiently higher than any residual unerased signals to make these inaudible.

Independent tests showed Dolby HX could raise the saturation levels at 10–12 kHz by 10 dB. According to Dolby, the improvement was most pronounced with high quality, high coercivity tape formulations. Poor-quality tapes did not significantly respond to adaptive biasing.

Dolby Laboratories launched Dolby HX at the Consumer Electronics Show in June 1979. The system was offered to existing Dolby B licensees at no extra charge. In 1980–1981, Aiwa, Harman Kardon and TEAC integrated Dolby HX into their cassette decks but no other manufacturers followed suit. Despite favorable reviews, Dolby HX was a marketing and an engineering failure. It was tested and rejected by audio engineers; while most did not disclose their findings, Willi Studer publicly spoke against the adoption of Dolby HX. According to Studer, the shortcomings of Dolby HX greatly outweighed its intended benefits. A 1981 press release by Dolby for the German market indirectly blamed the system's failure on conservatism in the industry. According to Dolby, Dolby HX "intervenes very far into recorder development and cannot simply be added to the existing electronics. It requires a fundamental redevelopment of the recording amplifier." Dolby, however, still hoped Dolby HX would gain acceptance "because it enables high fidelity quality with the future microcassette recorders with a tape speed of 2.4 cm/s". The latter promise did not materialize, either.

The main drawback of Dolby HX was that, being a feedforward control, it monitored the signal at its source but ignored the signal reaching the recording head. Variations in the gain or the frequency response of the recording chain disrupted the bias control curve. The adjustable pre-emphasis sub-circuitry was unnecessarily complex and expensive for the consumer industry. The Dolby B envelope detector, which by design was fairly slow, could not reliably track fast transients. Bundling adaptive biasing with noise reduction at the hardware level was the worst of all shortcomings. The user could not turn off the Dolby B decoder and still use Dolby HX while recording. This discouraged the use of the more effective dbx noise reduction. The 30 dB gain in signal-to-noise ratio provided by dbx made Dolby HX virtually unnecessary.

== Dolby HX Pro ==
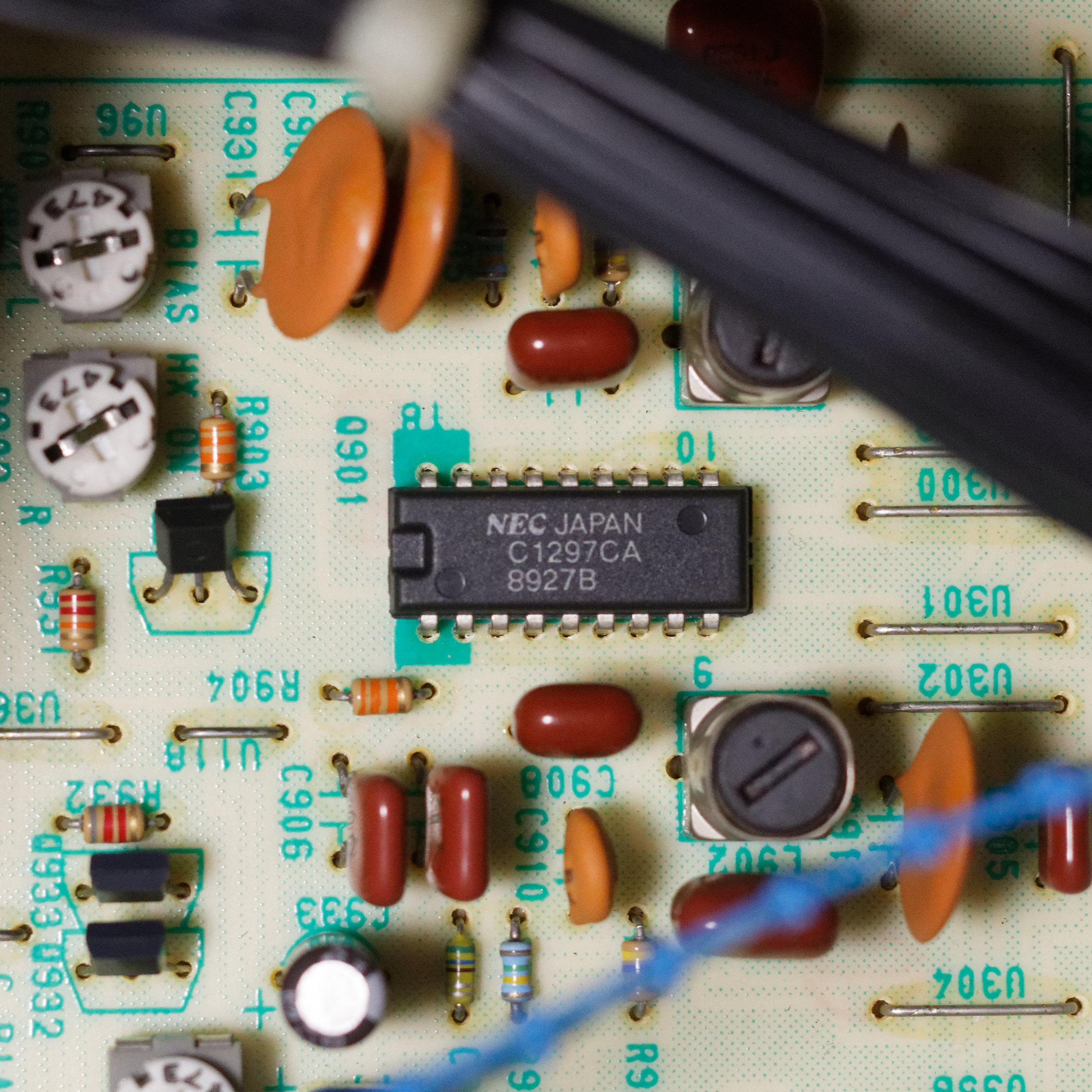
The complete Dolby HX circuitry built around the NEC μPC1297, made in 1989. The shown implementation is a rare example of a defeatable HX Pro, controlled with a user-accessible on/off switch.

In 1980, an alternative implementation of adaptive biasing was patented by Jørgen Selmer Jensen of Bang & Olufsen (B&O). Unlike the feedforward Dolby HX, the B&O circuit was a feedback system. According to the patent, it monitored the high-frequency voltage at the "hot" end of the recording head, extracting the combined envelope of bias and treble audio signals. An error amplifier continuously compared the envelope with the preset reference level and adjusted the bias current being fed to the recording head via a resistive opto-isolator. (Note: In practical applications the latter were replaced with variable-gain amplifiers, for example, built around the LM13700 transconductance amplifier).) The monaural circuit was easily scalable for stereophonic and multitrack recording, and enabled easy adjustments of the normal bias level.

According to B&O, its system assured only 3-5 dB gain in treble saturation, far less than Dolby HX. B&O's system did not rely on the Dolby IC and could be used with or without any noise reduction system. Negative feedback compensated for variations in gain and frequency response in the recording chain, eliminating the key shortcoming of Dolby HX. As a side benefit, the B&O system was also effective in reel-to-reel recorders.

Dolby Laboratories acquired the rights to the B&O patent and became its sole worldwide distributor. The new system was named Dolby HX Professional, which was later shortened to Dolby HX Pro. B&O retained the rights to use Dolby HX Pro in its products and, according to sources affiliated with Selmer, received a share of future licensing revenue.

At its launch, Dolby targeted HX Pro at professional markets. In August 1982, industrial tape duplicator manufacturer Electro Sound introduced HX Pro into its cassette-duplicator catalogue. Warner Records became the first major recording label to adopt HX Pro for mass duplication. By February 1983, according to Dolby, the company had two licensees in the home audio industry; Aiwa and Harman Kardon. The early adopters had to build Dolby HX Pro circuitry with general-purpose operational amplifiers and transconductance amplifiers until the 1985 introduction of a dedicated IC, the NEC μPC1297. The new proposal was well received by the industry and by 1986, Dolby HX Pro became a standard feature in the upper segment of consumer cassette decks. In the following years, Dolby HX Pro migrated into the entry-level consumer segment, becoming the de facto standard equipment in consumer hi-fi, and was also integrated into professional reel-to-reel recorders.

== Subsequent development ==
In 1983, adaptive biasing gained popularity in the Soviet Union. The earliest implementation, published by Nikolay Sukhov, was developed after Dolby HX Pro. It blended the elements of HX Pro (feedback control) and Dolby HX, varying the supply voltage to the common erase/bias generator, and added safeguards against transient overload, a common problem when recording from worn LP records. The revised design, which used a new precision rectifier IC, was published in 1987.

In line with the tastes of the home audio community, which still preferred reel-to-reel tapes to cassettes, the 1987 version was targeted at cassette decks and reel-to-reel decks. Adaptive biasing cannot substantially improve the performance of one-quarter-inch (0.64 cm) tape running at 19.5 cm/s (7.5 in/s) or higher speeds in standard reel-to-reel recorders; its saturation envelope is suitably high for music signals. Adaptive biasing, however, permits a decrease in treble equalization from the standard 50 μs to 10 μs. A fivefold reduction of the time constant corresponds to a fivefold decrease in apparent noise floor at middle and treble frequencies. According to Sukhov, his system enables a practical signal-to-noise ratio of more than 80 dB, without noise reduction. Sukhov's designs were the subject of five patents issued between 1984 and 1989, all of which referenced the earlier Selmer patent as prior art.
