= Studer =

Swiss audio equipment manufacturer

- Founded: 1948; 78 years ago in Zurich, Switzerland
- Founder: Willi Studer
- Owner: Evertz Microsystems
- Website: studer.evertz.com

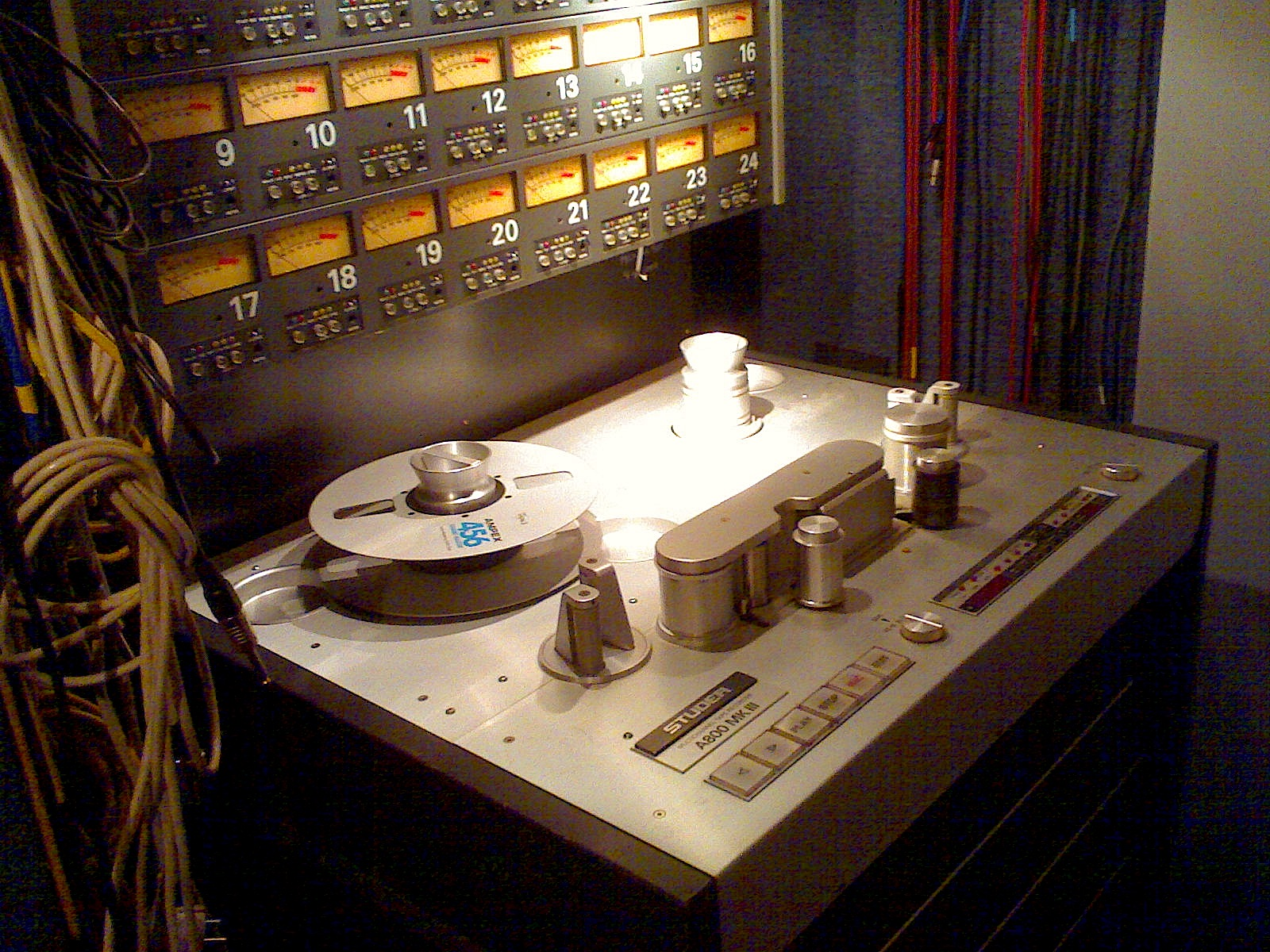
Studer A800 MK III 24-track recorder

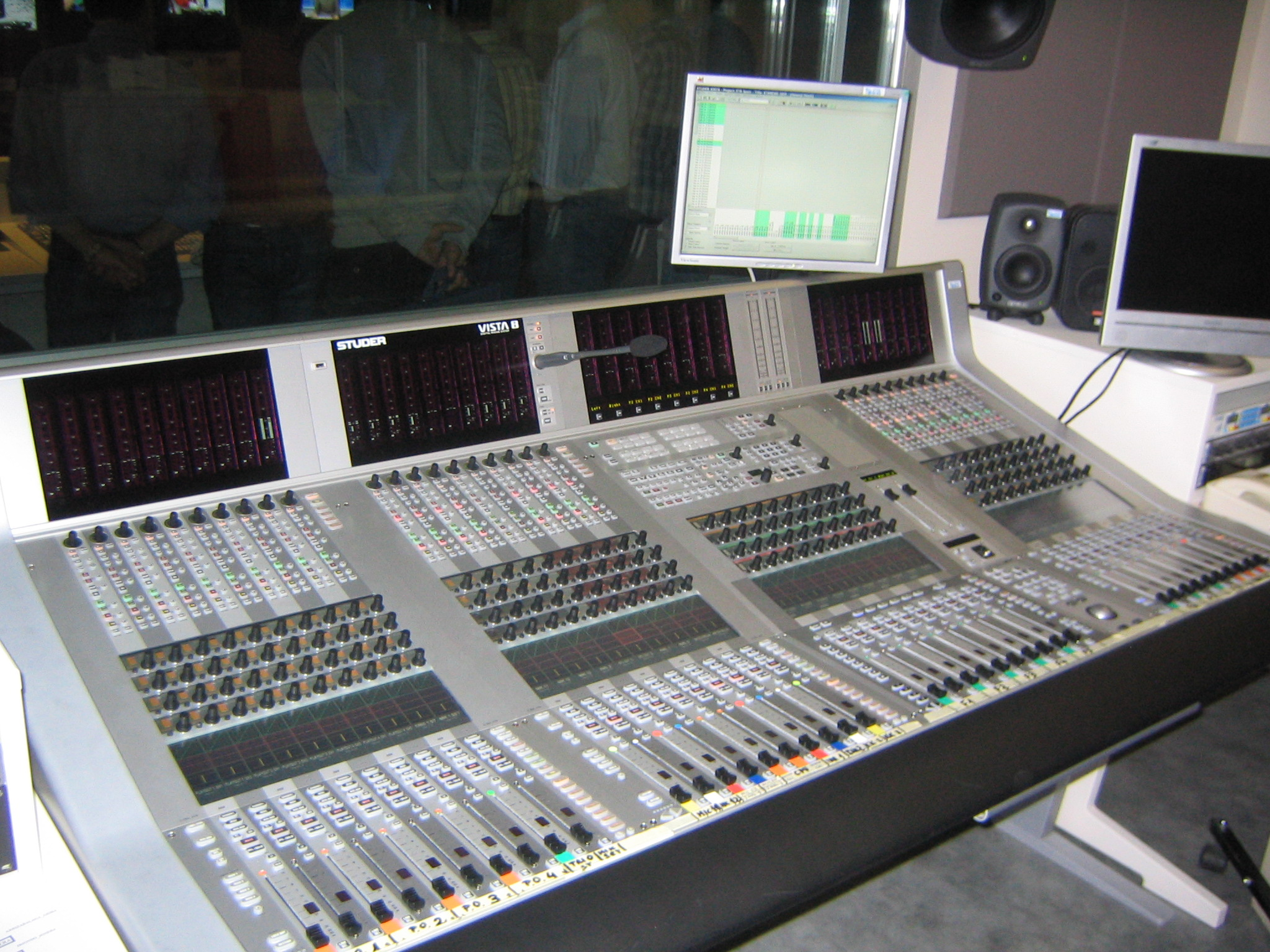
Studer Vista 8 digital audio console

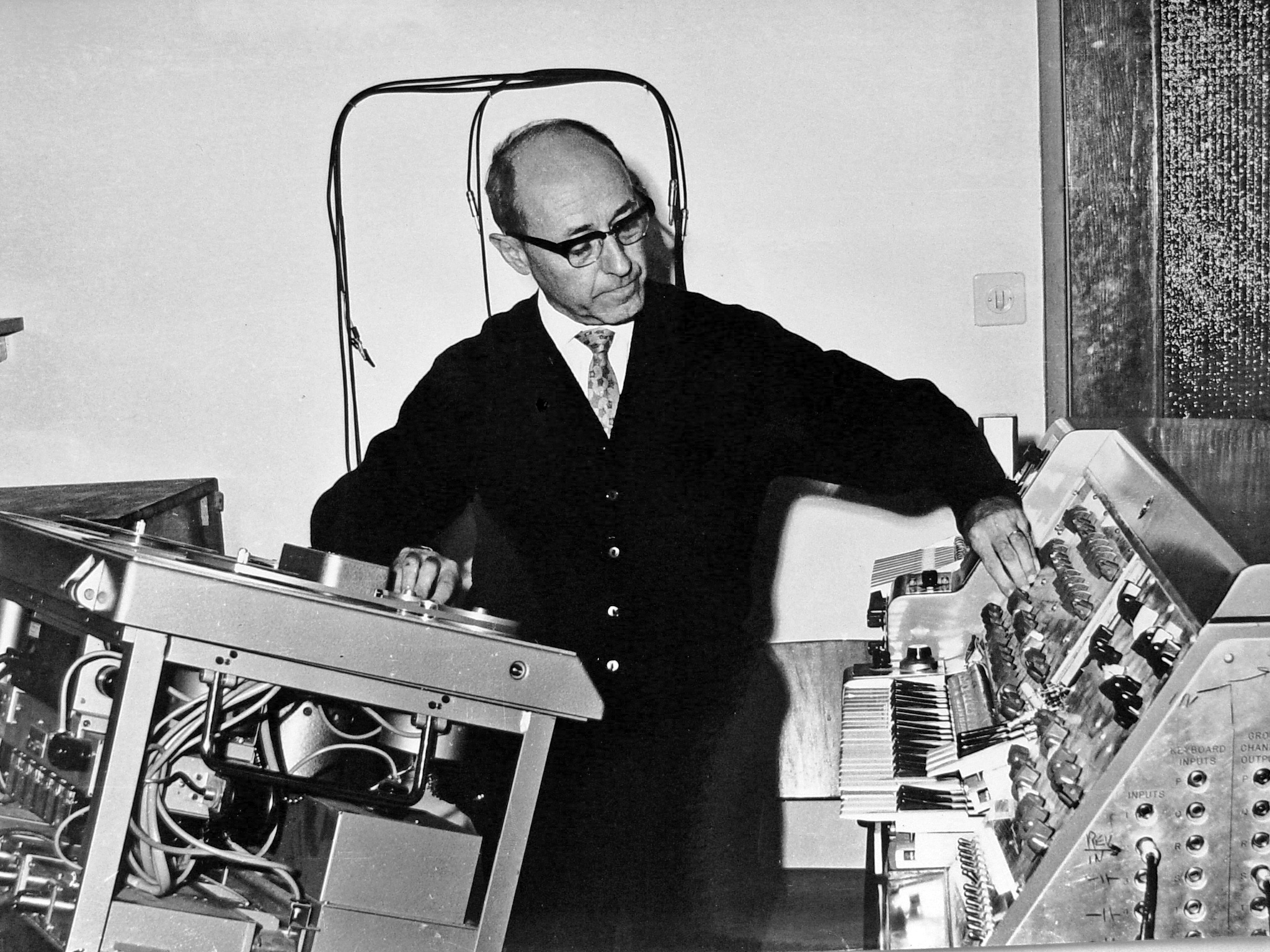
Israeli composer Josef Tal at the Electronic Music Studio in Jerusalem (c. 1965). On the right a sound synthesizer, on the left a Studer C37 vacuum tube reel-to-reel tape recorder

Studer is a designer and manufacturer of professional audio equipment for recording studios and broadcasters. The company was founded in Zurich, Switzerland, in 1948 by Willi Studer. It initially became known in the 1950s for its professional tape recorders. In the 1990s, the company moved into the manufacture of mixing consoles.

Management, sales, engineering, R&D and customer service were based in Regensdorf, Switzerland, until owners Harman International Industries closed down the Swiss entity in March 2018, transferring the now decentralized operation to China, Hungary, and the US. Manufacturing, marketing, and customer support were part of the Soundcraft facility in Potters Bar, England until Harman closed the Potters Bar facility in June 2016 and moved manufacturing and customer support to Hungary. Studer was a subsidiary of Harman International Industries. On February 9, 2021, Evertz Microsystems acquired the Studer audio brand from Harman.

== History ==
Willi Studer began to make high-voltage oscilloscopes in 1948. These products were produced until 1968. In March 1951, Studer introduced the Revox brand for its consumer products.

In 1990, Studer sold the Studer-Revox group to Motor-Columbus AG, including all subsidiary companies. In 1991, Motor-Columbus split the Studer-Revox Group into separate Studer, Revox and manufacturing divisions. Motor-Columbus sold several subsidiaries and plants.

The extensive reorganization culminated in the sale of the Studer group to Harman International Industries in March 1994. The Revox group was excluded and sold to private investors. On March 17, 1994, Harman completed its acquisition and acquired from Motor-Columbus AG 100% of Studer-Revox AG.

Harman paid 100 Swiss Francs (approximately US$70.00) for all of the issued and outstanding stock in Studer-Revox. Harman assumed approximately 23 million Swiss Francs (US$16 million) of Studer-Revox post-acquisition debt. Harman later moved some of its Studer business operations to England and merged them with operations of its Soundcraft subsidiary.

Willi Studer died on March 1, 1996.

In 2006, Harman closed all of the original headquarters of the brands in its professional division portfolio and moved Studer support and manufacturing to Pécs, Hungary to cut costs.

Harman sold the Studer brand and intellectual property in February 2021. The Studer brand was purchased by Canadian broadcast equipment manufacturer Evertz Microsystems. Evertz continues to manufacture the Studer Vista 1, V and X from their manufacturing plants in Burlington, Ontario and are actively developing Studer products.

== Tape recorders ==
In 1949, Studer branched out into the audio business by modifying imported tape recorders from Ampex in the United States. By 1950, they had developed their own line of tape recorders, named the Dynavox series. Over the years, the company built a variety of 2-track recorder models for stereo recording and stereo mixdown.

Some Studer model variants were sold under the Revox name, with slight modifications, at a lower price. The Revox variants were designed for consumer use, with features such as IR remote control and the omission of balanced input and output sockets. The core circuitry of the two was otherwise substantially identical. One of the company's models was the Revox A77 recorder, which was introduced in 1967.

Studer also designed and produced multitrack recorders. Studer's first multi-track machine, the model J37, was released in 1964. It recorded 4 tracks on one-inch tape. At EMI Studios London (later renamed Abbey Road Studios), The Beatles used a pair of J37s to record Sgt. Pepper's Lonely Hearts Club Band in 1967. Later analog Studer models - the A80, A800, A820, A827 - were built in 8-, 16-, and 24-track configurations using tape widths of up to two inches. Studer recorders quickly became standard equipment at many top studios worldwide, often paired with Neve consoles. Some studios have continued to use Studer recorders to the present day. The analog sound of machines like the A800 - both the electronics and the additional characteristics of the recorded tape - remained popular into the digital era with digital audio workstation (DAW) plug-ins as additional sonic tools for producers and engineers.

Sales of new analog machines continued into the early 1990s, when they began to be replaced by digital recorders. In this period, Studer introduced the D820 and D827 multitrack models, which employed the Digital Audio Stationary Head standard. However, digital tape formats eventually fell out of favor with the introduction of computerized hard disk drive recording systems and DAW software products, such as Pro Tools.

A Studer A800 MKIII is the focus of the opening shot of the video for the 1988 Guns N' Roses song "Patience".

== Mixing consoles ==
In the mid-1990s, Studer started to develop digital mixing consoles. After the introduction of OnAir 2000 with Touch'n Action user interface in 1997, the D950 was the first digital large frame desk Studer introduced in 1998. With Vista Series (Vista 1, 5, 6, 7, 8, 9, V, and X) Studer launched in 2003 the Vistonics user interface with knobs-on-glass technology. Some Vista models have been discontinued, including the Vista 5, but Vista 1, V, and X remain in production. Vista 5BE (Black Edition) was the final model of this series, continuing the use of x86 CPU technology, replacing SHARC-based DSP engines, but production on the 5BE was shelved as part of the discontinuation of the Vista 5 product family, the Vista 5BE being almost identical in function and operational features to the Vista V, which continues to be produced by Evertz.

The Studer Vista 9M2 (launched September 2013) is a TV broadcast/live production console equipped with the patented Vistonics knobs-on-glass user interface and FaderGlow is used by TV broadcasters including the BBC, RAI, France TV, TV Globo, ABC, NRK, DR and many others. Studer also offers radio broadcast consoles with the Glacier control surfaces (replacing the now-discontinued On Air 3000 and 2500 controllers) added to the remaining On Air range that includes the OnAir 1500.

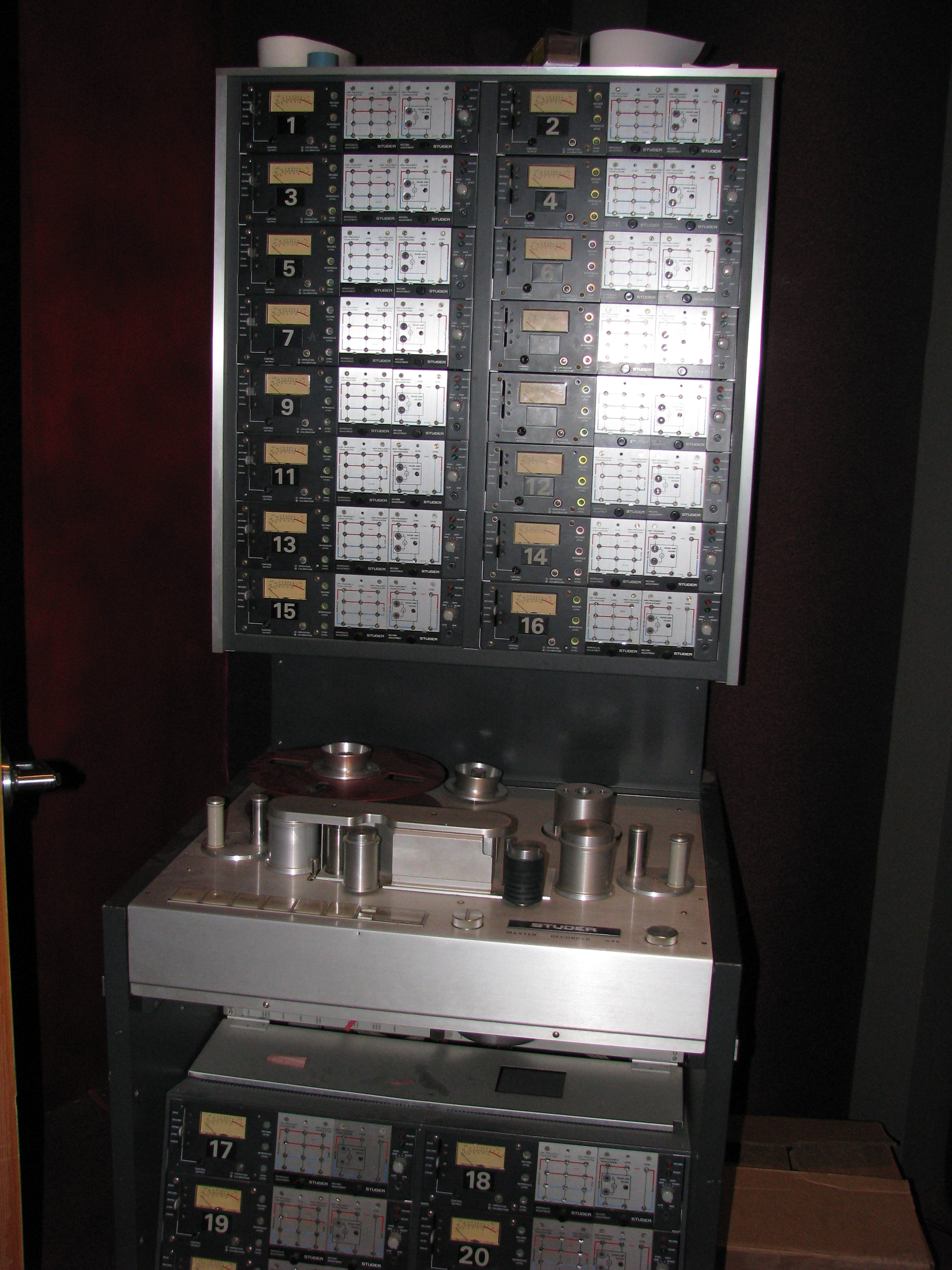
Studer A80, 24-track recorder

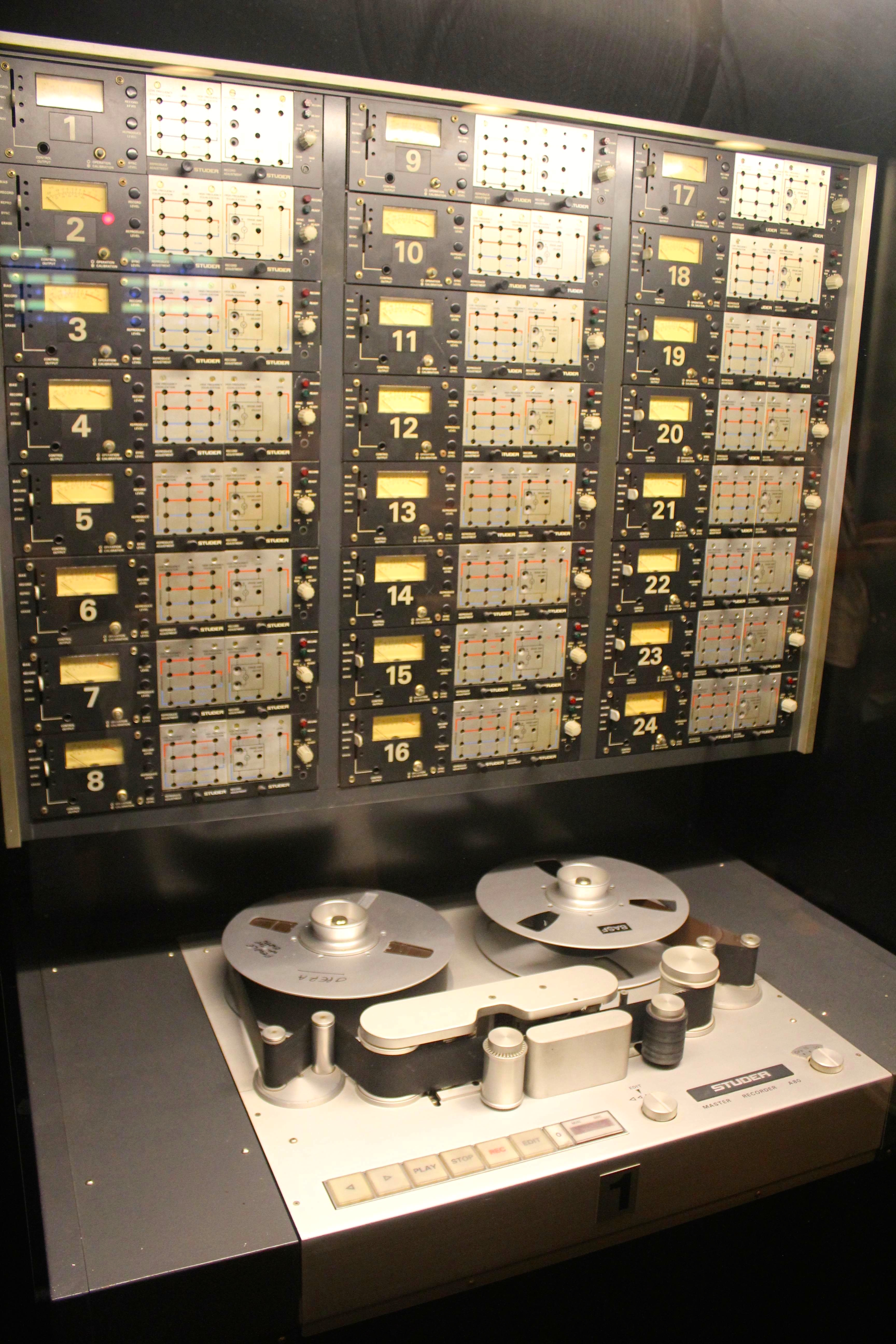
Studer A80 at Mountain Studios used by the rock band Queen

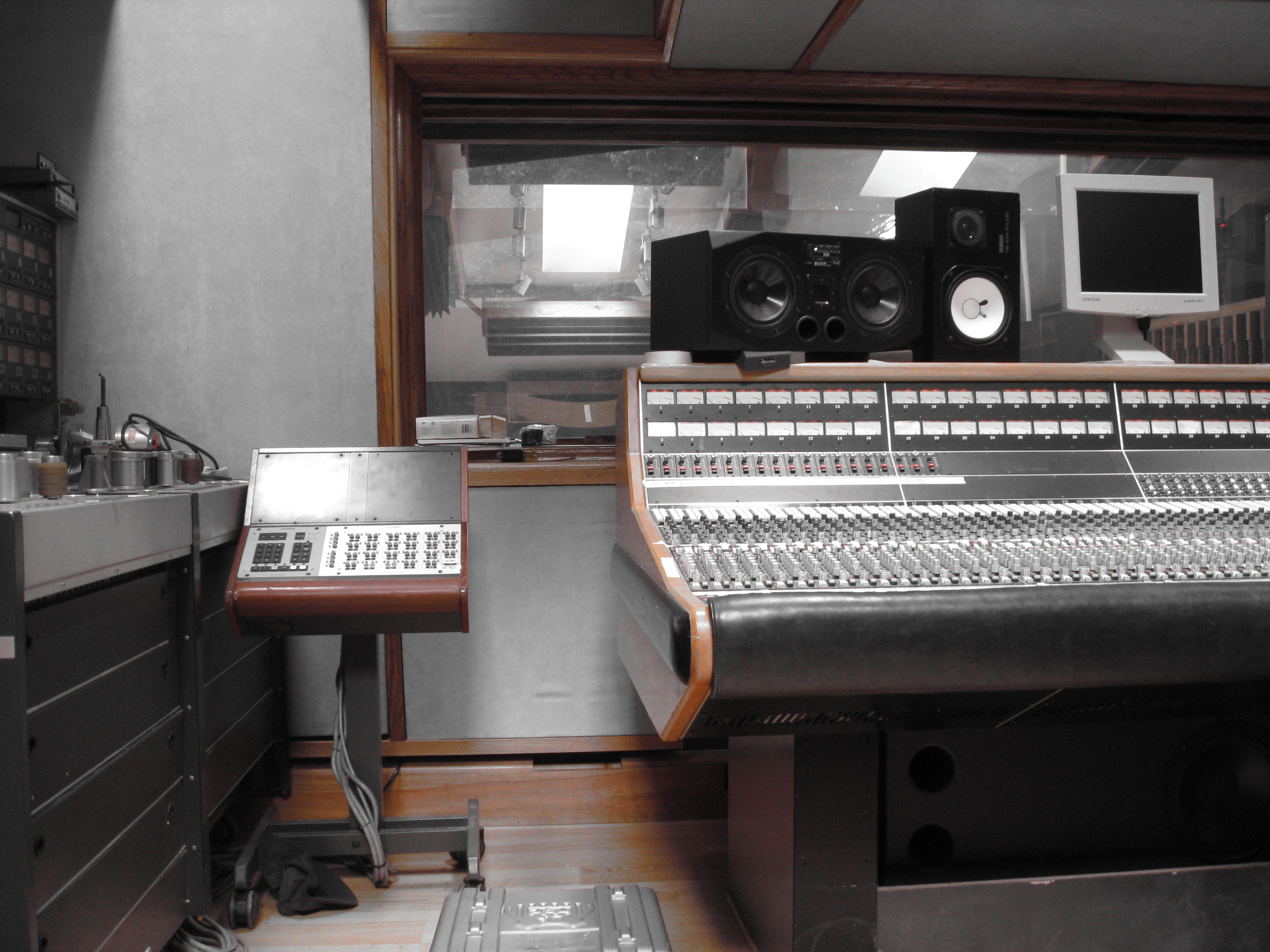
Remote controller for Studer A800 MKIII (center left)

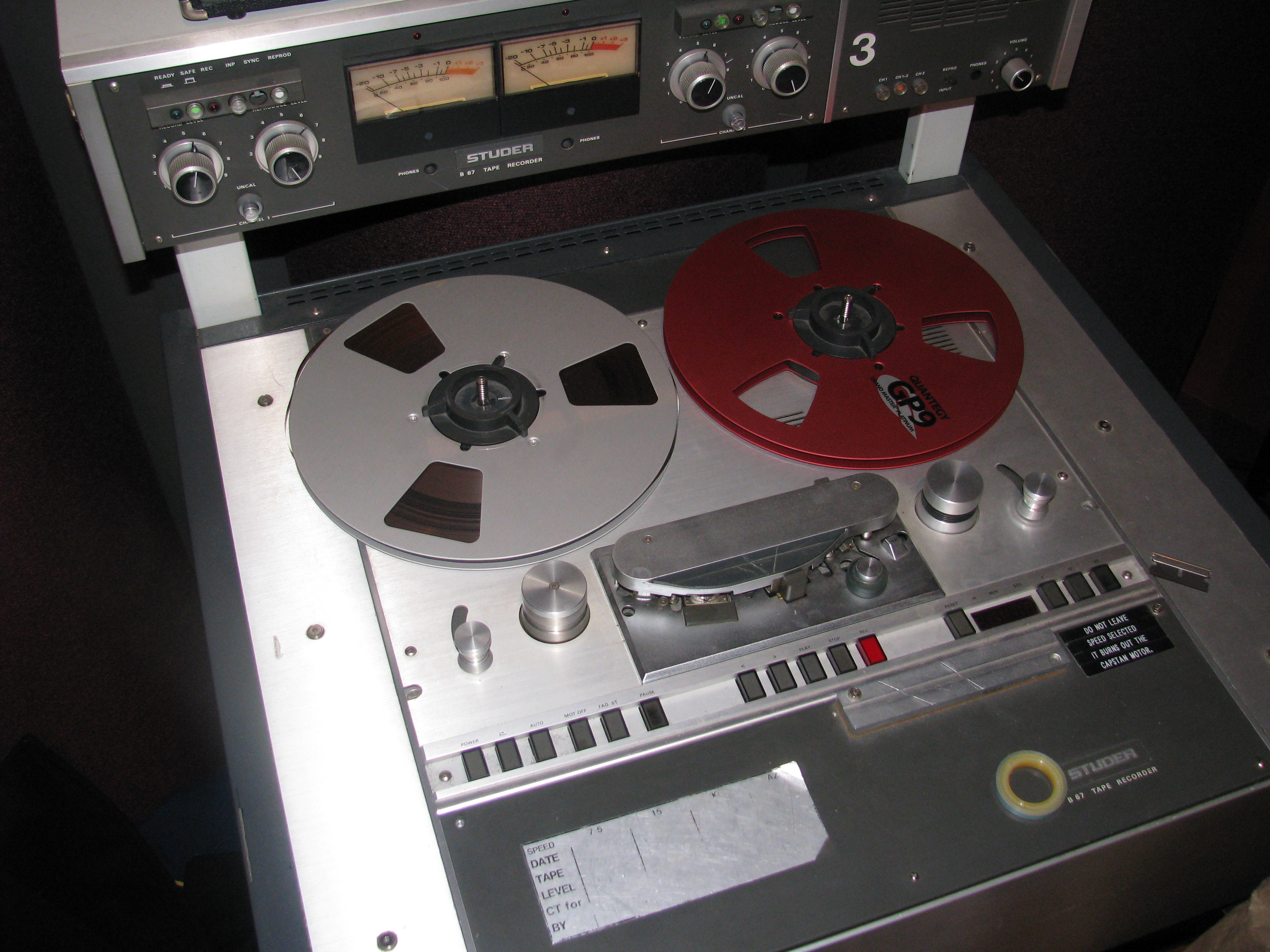
Studer B67, 2-track recorder

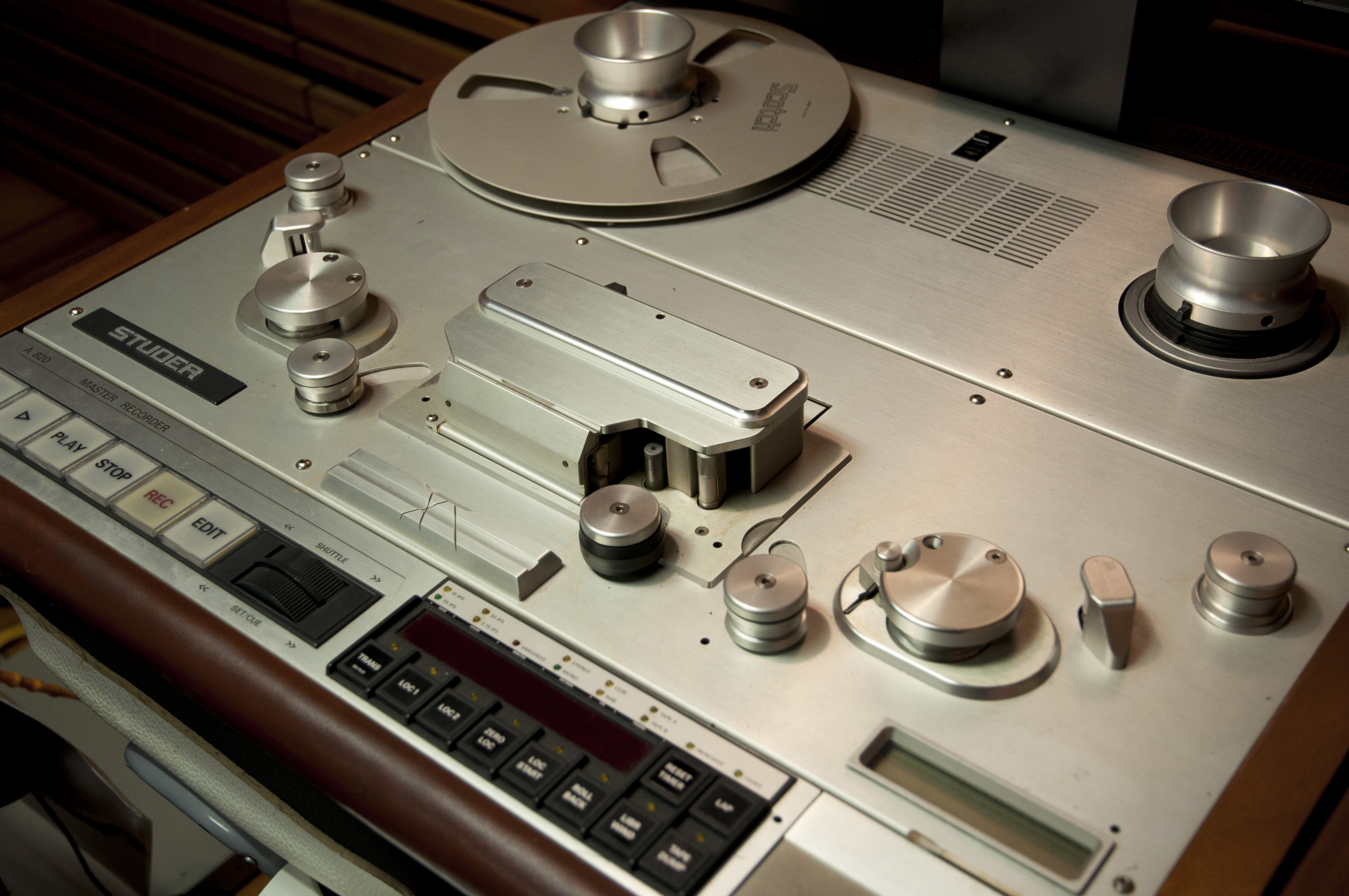
Studer A820, 2-track recorder

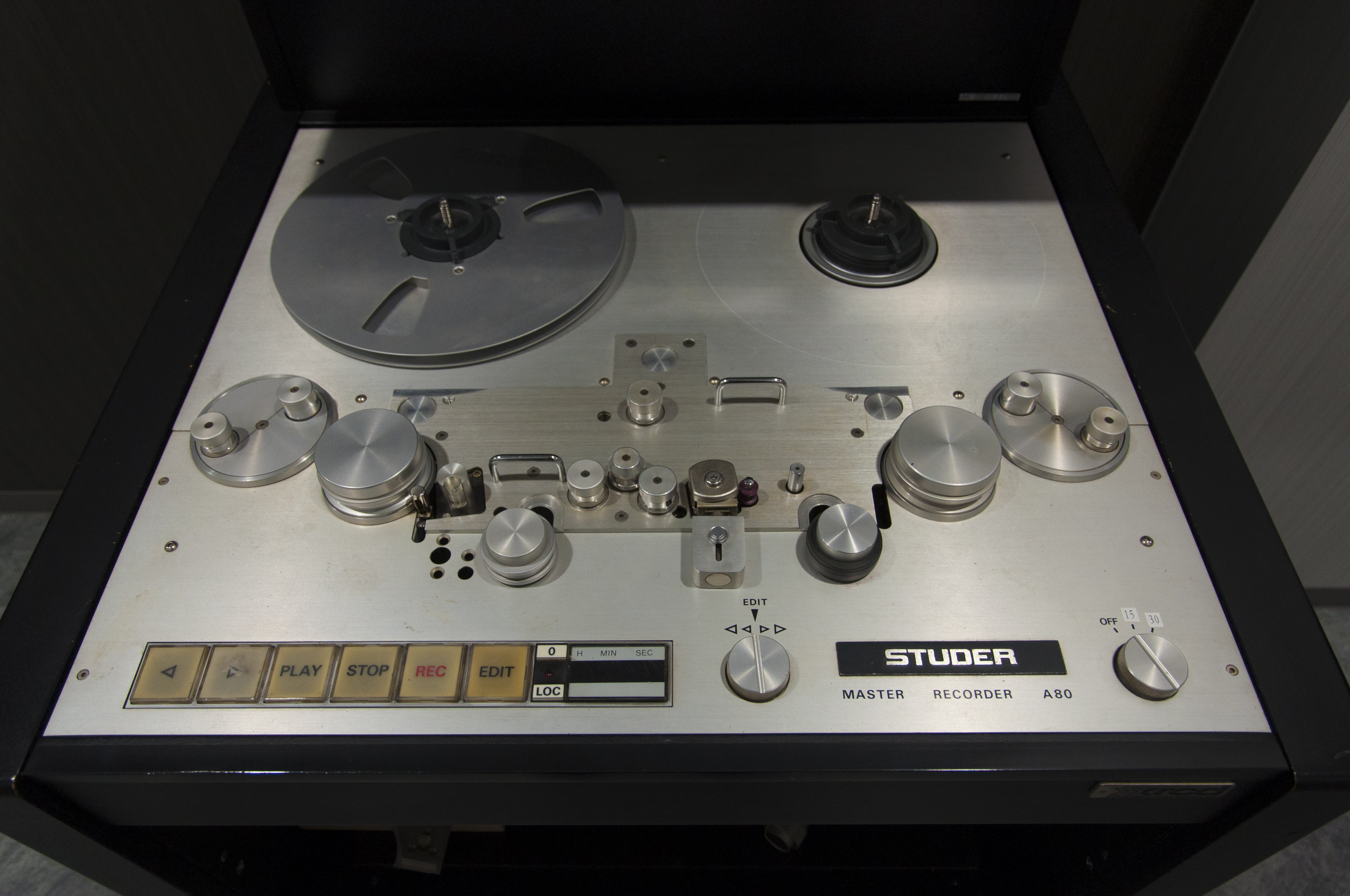
Studer A80, 2-track recorder, mastering version

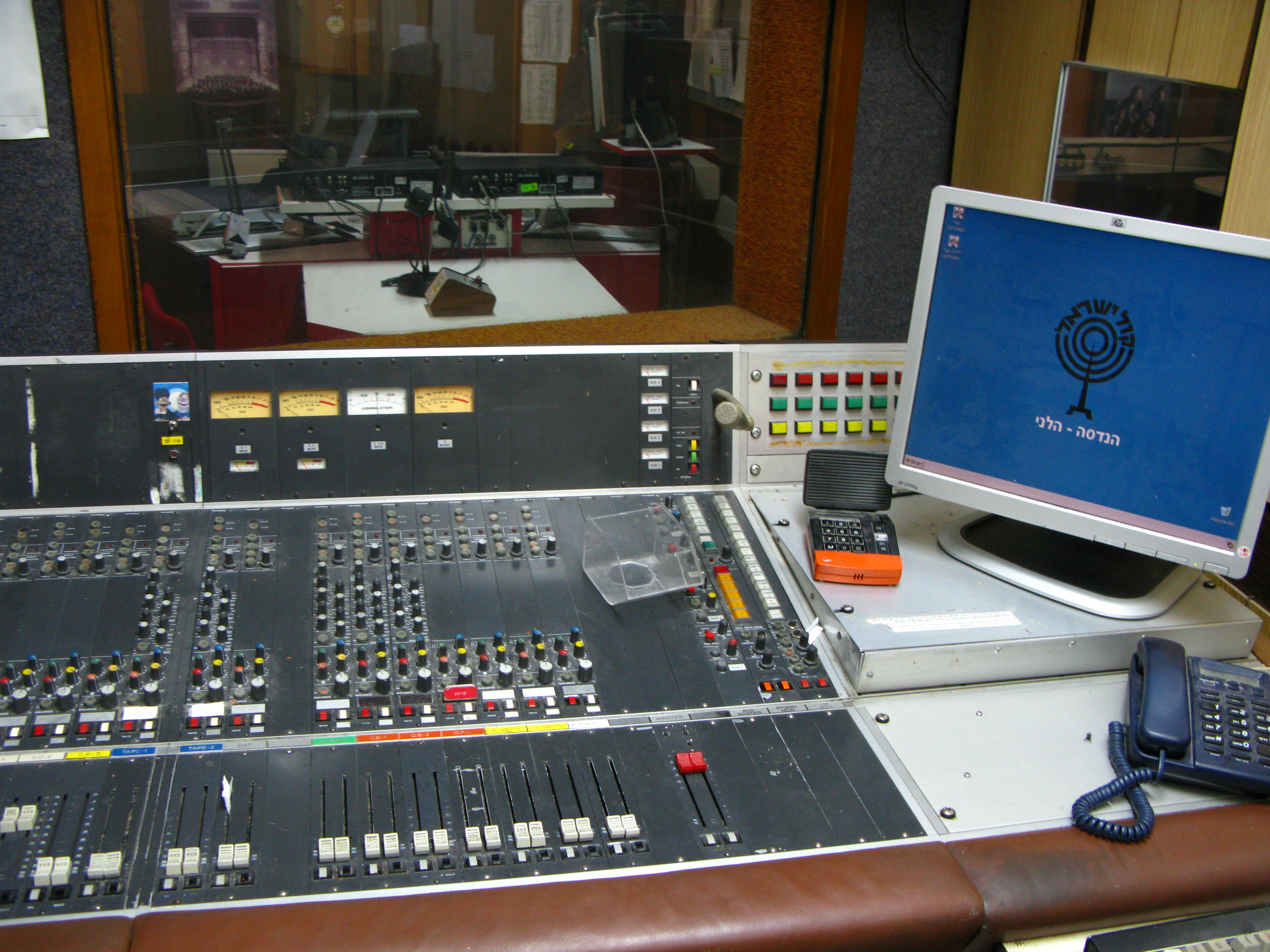
Studer broadcasting audio console at IBA Radio Kol Israel in Jerusalem
