= High Com =

Noise reduction system

The High Com (also as HIGH COM, both written with a thin space (Note: Telefunken's official spelling of the name was "High Com" (also as "HIGH COM"), both written with a thin space. However, Nakamichi's official spelling of their variant of Telefunken's High Com II was "High-Com II". Many independent German authors would use "High-Com" also for Telefunken's system because of a grammar feature called Durchkopplung. Compounds are concatenated without space in German. Compounds, which can't be combined without a space for linguistical reasons, are concatenated with a hyphen instead. Since High Com is a compound, the correct German spelling in normal prose would be "High-Com" despite Telefunken's alternative spelling. This holds true even more for further combinations such as "High-Com-System" (rather than "High Com-System" or "High Com System").)) noise reduction system was developed by Telefunken, Germany, in the 1970s as a high quality high compression analogue compander for audio recordings.

== High Com ==
Compander variants
| Name | telcom c4 | | High Com | High-Com II | High-Com III | High Com FM |
|---|---|---|---|---|---|---|
| Medium | magnetic tape | transmission lines, links | magnetic tape | magnetic tape, vinyl disc (Note: The Nakamichi High-Com II Noise Reduction System exists in two very similar but functionally slightly different versions: One variant has a special "Disk" mode setting to decode High-Com II encoded vinyl discs without having to pass the encoded signal through a connected tape deck first, whereas the other variant makes it slightly easier to activate the 400 Hz calibration tone and allows the Subsonic and MPX input filters to be activated at the same time.) | magnetic tape | FM radio broadcasting |
| Target market | professional | | consumer | consumer, semi-professional | semi-professional | consumer |
| Development start | 1971/1972 | ? | 1974 | 1978 | 1978 | 1979 |
| Introduction | 1975/1976 | ? | 1978 | 1979 | never | (1981–1984) |
| Compander type | linear fixed four-band (crossover: 215 Hz, 1.45 kHz, 4.8 kHz) | | broadband with pre-/deemphasis from 1.2 kHz to 8.6 kHz | fixed two-band (crossover: 4.8 kHz) with pre-/deemphasis | fixed three-band (crossover: c. 200–400 Hz?, 4.8 kHz?) without pre-/deemphasis | broadband without pre-/deemphasis |
| Compression | 1.5:1:1.5 | 2.5:1:2.5 | 2:1:2 | 2:1:2 | 2:1:2 | 2:1:2 |
| Noise reduction | 25–30 dB(A) | ? | 15–20 dB(A) | 20–25 dB(A) | 20–25 dB(A)? | 10 dB(A) |
| Calibration / ident tone | alternating 550/650 Hz, −0.13 dB, 320 nWb/m or 514 nWb/m (Note: Some telcom c4 companders have a "Telcom Auto" setting which would automatically activate or bypass the telcom c4 system depending on if the telcom ident tone alternating between 550 Hz and 650 Hz every 500 ms was detected on the leader tape or not.) | N/A | originally 440 Hz, later 400 Hz, 0 dB, 200 nWb/m | 400 Hz, 0 dB, 200 nWb/m | N/A | N/A |
| Leader tape | 38 cm/s: red-white-black-white, (Note: The colored leader tapes standardized (for example in "Technisches Pflichtenheft 3/9 der öffentlich-rechtlichen Rundfunkanstalten in der Bundesrepublik Deutschland" or the later "Technische Richtlinie 3/9 Vorspann-, Zwischen- und Endbänder für Schaltzwecke im Studio" (as of February 1987) by IRT and the German public broadcasting industry indicating a record using Telefunken's telcom c4 system are defined as a sequence of 10 mm red (RAL 3000), 20 mm white (RAL 9010), 10 mm black (RAL 9011) and 5 mm white for 38 cm/s recordings, and 10 mm blue (RAL 5007), 20 mm white, 10 mm black and 5 mm white for 19 cm/s. For possible detection utilizing a transmissiometer, the white, red and blue tape stripes must provide a transparency between 27% and 60% in contrast to less than 8% for the black stripes and the magnetic tape itself. The colors must be facing the magnetizable coating / tape head side of the tape.) 19 cm/s: blue-white-black-white | N/A | N/A | N/A | N/A | N/A |

The idea of a compander for consumer devices was based on studies of a fixed two-band compander by Jürgen Wermuth of AEG-Telefunken ELA, Wolfenbüttel, developer of the Telefunken telcom c4 (formally abbreviated as "TEL" in professional broadcasting) four-band audio compander for professional use. (Note: Between 1987 and 1990, the East-German RFZ in Leipzig developed a number of telcom c4-compatible companders like the 8-channel NV 2180 (for Mechlabor STM-700 etc.), the 8-channel NV 2180/1, the 4-channel NV 2181, the 2-/4-channel NV 2181/1 (with NV 2180 L1 cards), or the 2-channel VTR/MAZ compander NV 2182.) In April 1974, the resulting "RUSW-200" prototype first led to the development of a sliding two-band compander by Ernst F. Schröder of Telefunken Grundlagenlaboratorium, Hannover since July 1974.

However, the finally released High Com system, which was marketed by Telefunken since 1978, worked as a broadband 2:1:2 compander, achieving almost 15 dB of noise reduction for low and up to 20 dB RMS A-weighted for higher frequencies, reducing the noise power down to 1% while avoiding most of the acoustic problems observed with other high compression broadband companders such as EMT/NoiseBX, Burwen or dbx. (Note: Telefunken / TELDEC provided four High Com demonstration and test records labelled "High Com. Das neue Stör- und Rauschunterdrückungs-System. Von Telefunken." on ferro-magnetic (IEC type I) cassette tapes with bias 120 μs: "Eine Meß-Cassette." (64.22029): 1. Level tone 400 Hz 200 nWb/m, 2. Pink noise High Com encoded (level −30 dB_{eff} below 200 nWb/m without compander); "Eine Demonstrations-Cassette." (64.21824), and "Eine Meß- und Demonstrations-Cassette." (64.21972): A. Calibration advice with measurement tone, B. 1. Richard Strauss Till Eulenspiegel, 2. Beethoven Wo O. 16,^{[*]} 3. Rimsky-Korssakoff Capriccio Espagnol, 4. Schubert–Noris Serenade, 5. Studio take II.^{[*]}^{[**]} There also was a "Eine Demonstrations-Cassette." (64.22089) variant on Agfa Superchrome (IEC type II) cassette tape with bias 70 μs and changed track order: A. 1. Beethoven: Klavier-Konzert Nr. 5 Es-dur, 2. Beethoven: Fidelio Gefangenen-Chor, 3. Rimsky-Korssakoff Capriccio Espagnol, 4. Berlioz: Symphonie Fantastique scene "Ein Ball", 5. Chiquitita/Stanley Black, 6. "L'animal" from the film "Ein irrer Typ", 7. Studio take. ^{[*]}Telcom c4 studio material. ^{[**]}Comment on sleeve: Musicians and sound engineer before recording while tuning instruments and electronics. Even the hum of a defective amplifier is audible. (NB. There also was an earlier version of the calibration tape containing a 440 Hz rather than a 400 Hz test tone.^{[A]}^{[B]}))

In order to facilitate cost-effective mass-production in consumer devices such as cassette decks, the compander system was integrated into an analogue IC, TFK U401B (Note: The Telefunken TFK U401B integrated circuit was available in five revisions: TFK U401B chips with a yellow dot are equivalent to the U401BG. TFK U401BG chips with a blue dot are equivalent to the TFK U401BR. TFK U401BR chips with yellow dot as well as yellow and blue dots exist also. Yet another revision was planned to incorporate the changes to Telefunken's High Com system since about 1982 to no longer require external circuit modifications, but was apparently never released. These revisions were also used on Telefunken's own High Com modules, which were available in various assembly variants (for example BS 5335 / AT 349 355 003 or BS 5356 / AT 349 355 024) and also used in many third-party products.) / U401BG / U401BR, developed by Dietrich Höppner and Kurt Hintzmann of AEG-Telefunken Halbleiterwerk, Heilbronn. The chip contained more than 500 transistors.

With minimal changes in the external circuitry the IC could also be used to emulate a mostly Dolby B-compatible compander as in the DNR (Dynamic Noise Reduction) system for backward compatibility. Consequently, second-generation tape decks with High Com incorporated a DNR expander as well, whereas in some late-generation Telefunken, ASC and Universum tape decks this even worked during recording, but was left undocumented for legal reasons.

== High-Com II and III ==
Nakamichi, one of the more than 25 licensees of the High Com system, supported the development of a noise reduction system that could exceed the capabilities of the then-prevalent Dolby B-type system. However, it became apparent that a single-band compander without sliding-band technology, which was protected by Dolby patents, suffered too many audible artifacts. So, High Com was further developed into the two-band High Com II and three-band High Com III 2:1:2 systems by Werner Scholz and Ernst F. Schröder of Telefunken assisted by Harron K. Appleman of Nakamichi in 1978/1979. The two-band variant was eventually released exclusively as Nakamichi High-Com II Noise Reduction System later in 1979, (Note: In 1979, Nakamichi, in cooperation with Three Blind Mice Records, Inc., offered a High-Com II demonstration tape S 008 / T-480305, a limited edition not-for-sale High Com II encoded audiophile cassette tape sample recorded at 4.8 cm/s (1-7/8 ips) on a Nakamichi Metalloy Direct Cassette ZX C-15 with Fuji IEC type-IV metal tape with bias 70 μs. The tracks included on side A: 1. Little Step (Masaru Imada Quartet), 2. New Orleans Sunday (Shōji Yokouchi Trio & Yuri Tashiro), side B: ?.) (Note: Track list of Nakamichi High-Com II demonstration record NAK-100: Side A: Philharmonia Hungarica (Zoltan Rozsnyai): 1. Bizet (Carmen prelude) [2:30] 2. Berlioz (Rákóczi March from Damnation of Faust) [4:40] 3. Rimsky-Korsakov (Procession of the Nobles from Mlada) [4:55] 4. Brahms (Hungarian Dance No. 5) [4:30] 5. 400 Hz calibration tone. [1:00], Side B: S.M.A. Sextet (Sherman Martin Austin): 1. Impressions (John Coltrane) [5:00] 2. Mimosa (Dennis Irwin) [5:52] 3. Little B's Poem (Bobby Hutcherson) [3:12] 4. 400 Hz calibration tone [1:00].) increasing the amount of noise reduction on analogue recordings and transmissions by as much as 25 dB A-weighted.

== High-Com II for records ==
While originally designed for tape recordings, Nakamichi demonstrated the usage of High Com II on LP records as well in 1979.

In 1982, the same AEG-Telefunken team, who designed the High Com noise reduction system, also developed the IC U2141B for the CBS Laboratories CX noise reduction system for LP records, a system also incorporated into FMX, a noise reduction system for FM broadcasting developed by CBS.

== High Com FM ==
Similar to the earlier Dolby FM system in the US, a High Com FM system was evaluated in Germany between July 1979 and December 1981 by IRT. It was also considered to be adopted for AM broadcasting. It was based on the High Com broadband compander, but eventually changed to achieve 10 dB(A) only to improve compatibility with the existing base of receivers without built-in expander. The system was field-trialed in public German FM broadcasting between 1981 and 1984 and also discussed as an option to be introduced in Austria and France. However, despite the improvements it was eventually not introduced commercially because of the listening artifacts it created for receivers without expander.

== Impact ==
Besides Telefunken's own CN 750 High Com compander box, other companies also offered external High Com compander boxes such as the Aiwa HR-7 and HR-50, the Rotel RN-500 and RN-1000, (Note: Rotel's High Com companders RN-500 and RN-1000 used other time constants than Telefunken's High Com, thereby rendering the encoded material incompatible with other High Com companders. Early Rotel units internally used Telefunken High Com modules with two parts exchanged (R7 = 3.3 MΩ instead of 8.2 MΩ, C7 = 33 μF / 16 V instead of 0.22 μF / 16 V), whereas later units used their own circuitry.) (Note: Not all OEMs followed Telefunken's High Com specifications rigorously. Besides Rotel's changes of the time constants, Grundig and Nikko also introduced changes to the circuitry.) or the Diemme Sonic-distributed Aster Dawn SC 505 (Note: The companders Aster Dawn Stereo Compander SC 505 and Starsonic High-Com Noise Reduction System DL 506 were developed by Quirino Cieri, manufactured by two art shops and distributed through Diemme Sonic and D.A.A.F., both residing at Jacopo Palma 11, Milano, Italy at the time. Both companders were available in black and silver case finish.) and the Starsonic DL 506, as distributed by D.A.A.F. A low-cost implementation of the Telefunken High Com system as external compander box became available as Hobby-Com, developed by Telefunken product development and Thomsen-Elektronik for WDR, distributed by vgs, and promoted for do-it-yourself assembly in the popular TV series Hobbythek format by Jean Pütz on 7 February 1980. In 1981 and 1982, do-it-yourself High Com kits were introduced from elektor (elektor compander/Hi-Fi-Kompander) and G.B.C. Amtron (micro line High-Com System UK 512 (W)). The only compander available for High-Com II was Nakamichi's own High-Com II unit.

More than one million High Com systems were sold between 1978 and 1982. While implemented in dozens of European and Japanese consumer device models and acoustically much superior to other systems such as Dolby B, C, dbx, adres or Super D, the High Com family of systems never gained a similar market penetration. This was caused by several factors, including the existing pre-dominance of the Dolby system, with Dolby Laboratories introducing the "good enough" Dolby C update (with up to 15 dB A-weighted improvement) in 1980 as well, and also by the fact that High Com required higher quality tape decks and tapes to work with in order to give satisfactory results. High-Com II even required calibration of the playback level using a 400 Hz, 0 dB, 200 nWb/m calibration tone for optimum results, and with prices in the several hundred dollars for the external Nakamichi compander box it was much too expensive to be used by many people outside the small group of audiophiles using high-end tape recorders or open-reel decks. When AEG-Telefunken struggled financially in 1981/1982 and the Hannover development site was partially disbanded and refocused on digital technologies in 1983, this also put the High Com development to an end. The latest tape decks to come with High Com were produced in 1986.

Several software decoders were developed for telcom c4 and High Com, and are considered to be implemented for High-Com II

== Tape decks with High Com ==
These tape decks are known to provide built-in support for High Com:

- Akai GX-F37 (Note: The High Com module for the Akai GX-F37 was named BA-T2017A050A (CL-5602) and contained two Telefunken TFK U401BR chips.)
- ASC AS 3000
- Rosita Audion D 700
- Blaupunkt XC-240, XC-1400
- ELIN Professional Micro Component Cassette Deck - Modell TC-97
- Eumig FL-1000μP High Com (Note: The Eumig FL-1000μP was alternatively available with either the Dolby NR (type B) or the Telefunken High Com noise reduction system and corresponding front plates.)
- Filtronic FSK-200
- Grundig MCF 200, MCF 600, CF 5100, SCF 6200 (Note: The High Com module for one Grundig tape deck was named KPL-39302-942 / 39302-946 and contained one Telefunken TFK U401BR chip.)
- hgs ELECTRONIC Mini Altus HiFi-System Micro Component Stereo Cassette Deck
- Hitachi D-E75 DB/SL
- Imperial TD 6100
- Intel Professional Micro Component Cassette Deck - Modell TC-97
- Körting C 102, C 220
- Revox B710 High Com (Note: The Studer A710 was alternatively available with either Telefunken High Com and DNR (PCB 1.710.483-00 + 1.710.493-00 each based on two TFK U401BR), or with Dolby B and C (PCB 1.710.489-00 + 1.710.492-00 each based on two HA 12038) noise reduction modules and front plates. Likewise, the very similar Revox B710 was alternatively available in High Com and Dolby B versions, but could be factory-upgraded to support both, Dolby B and C after the release of the Revox B710 Mk II model, which featured Dolby B and C only as well.)
- Neckermann Palladium Mico Line 2000C
- Nikko ND-500H
- nippon TD-3003
- Saba CD278, CD 362, CD 363
- Schneider SL 7270 C
- Sencor SD-6650
- Siemens RC 333, RC 300
- Studer A710 High Com
- Telefunken TC 750, TC 450, TC 450M, TC 650, TC 650M, STC 1 / CC 20, MC 1, MC 2, HC 700, HC 800, HC 850, HC 1500, HC 3000, HC 750M, HC 730T, RC 100, RC 200, RC 300, Hifi Studio 1, Hifi Studio 1M, Studio Center 5004, Studio Center 5005, Studio Center 7004
- Tensai TFL-812
- Uher CG 321, CG 325, CG 344, CG 356, CG 365, mini-hit
- Quelle Universum Senator CT 2307, Senator CT 2307A, CT 2318 (for SYSTEM HIFI 7500 SL), Senator CT 2337, Senator VTCF 407
- Wangine K-3M, WSK-120, WSK-220

Other devices can be used with an external High Com compander box.

== See also ==
- CX (Compatible Expansion), another disk noise reduction system
- dbx, a competing noise reduction system
- Dolby noise reduction system
- Dolby SR (Spectral Recording)
- Dynamic Noise Reduction (DNR), a playback-only noise reduction system often confused with Dolby
- FMX (broadcasting), another FM noise reduction system
- UC (Universal Compatible), another disk noise reduction system
