= Jutz =

Jutz is a surname. Notable people with this surname include:

- Jakob Jutz (1915–1951), Swiss long-distance runner
- Thomm Jutz (born 1969), German-born American singer, songwriter, producer, and guitar player

== See also ==
- Lutz
- Putz (surname)
