= Putz =

Putz may refer to:

- Christmas putz, decorative miniature village elaborated from a nativity scene
- Putz (surname)

== See also ==
- Dick Putz Field, stadium in Saint Cloud, Minnesota
- Putt's Law
- List of Yiddish loanwords § P
