= MPX filter =

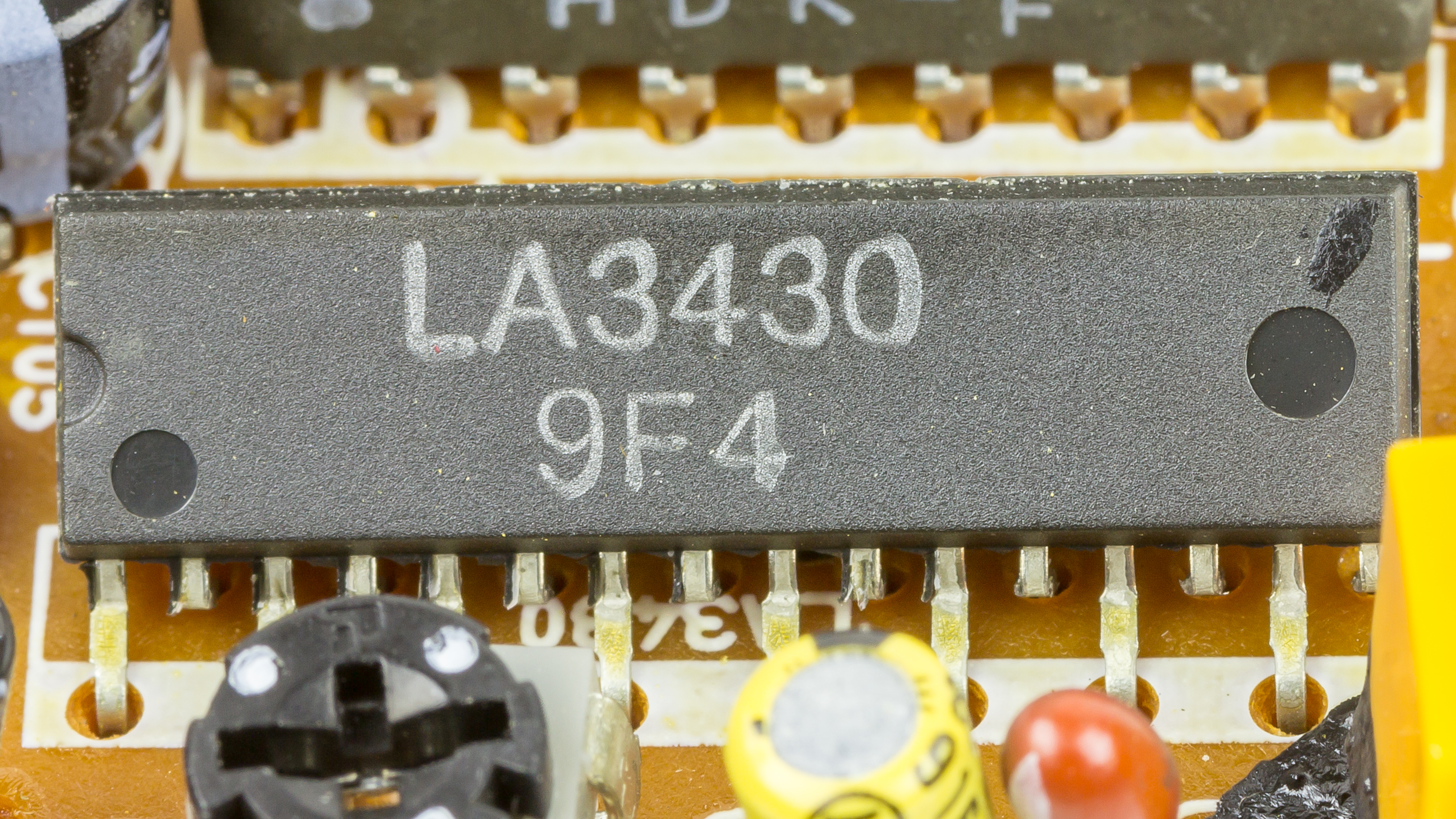
Sanyo LA3430 – PLL FM MPX stereo demodulator with pilot canceler for car stereo use

MPX filter is a function found in analogue stereo FM broadcasting and personal monitor equipment, FM tuners and cassette decks. An MPX filter is, at least, a notch filter blocking the 19 kHz pilot tone, and possibly higher frequencies in the 23–53 kHz and 63–75 kHz bands.

== Broadcasting and personal monitors ==
FM stereo broadcasts contain a pilot tone – a 19 kHz sinewave serving as a phase reference for decoding the stereophonic information. The system was developed jointly by Zenith and General Electric, and approved by the FCC in 1961. Normal monaural audio, the pilot tone and the double sideband stereophonic difference information are all mixed together into composite FM baseband signal extending to 53 kHz (stereo audio only) or 99 kHz (stereo audio plus an auxiliary subchannel, so-called SCA). The process of encoding the difference signal into the 23-53kHz band via double-sideband carrier-suppressed amplitude modulation is an instance of multiplexing (hence the name MPX filter).

The pilot tone resides inside the audio band (although beyond the range of many adult listeners), and can be compromised by high-energy treble components of the source. Any energy at frequencies above 19 kHz, which is the Nyquist frequency of FM stereo, may cause offensive audible aliasing described as "monkey chatter". Any energy between 18.5 and 19.5 kHz may disrupt stereo decoding, causing sudden rotation of the soundfield. For these reasons, source programs for commercial FM broadcasting are limited to 50 Hz – 15 kHz bandwidth with very steep 15 kHz low-pass filters.

Source programs transmitted to personal monitors on stage or in the recording studio do not need to follow the broadcast 50 Hz – 15 kHz standard, and may have substantial upper treble content. Sources that were subjected to excessive treble boost, or excessive stereo panning are particularly capable of degrading stereo FM reception. For this reason, they must pass through a brickwall MPX filter to clean up space for the pilot tone.

== Magnetic recording ==
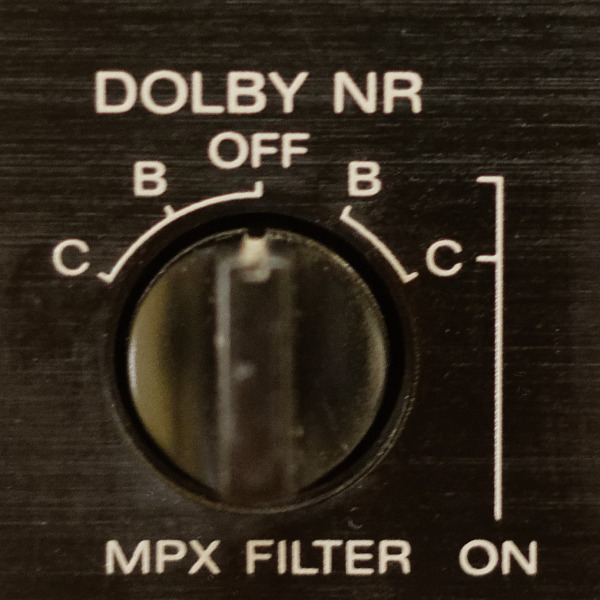
Combined MPX and Dolby switch of a Sony ES cassette deck. MPX may be engaged only when Dolby B or C is on.

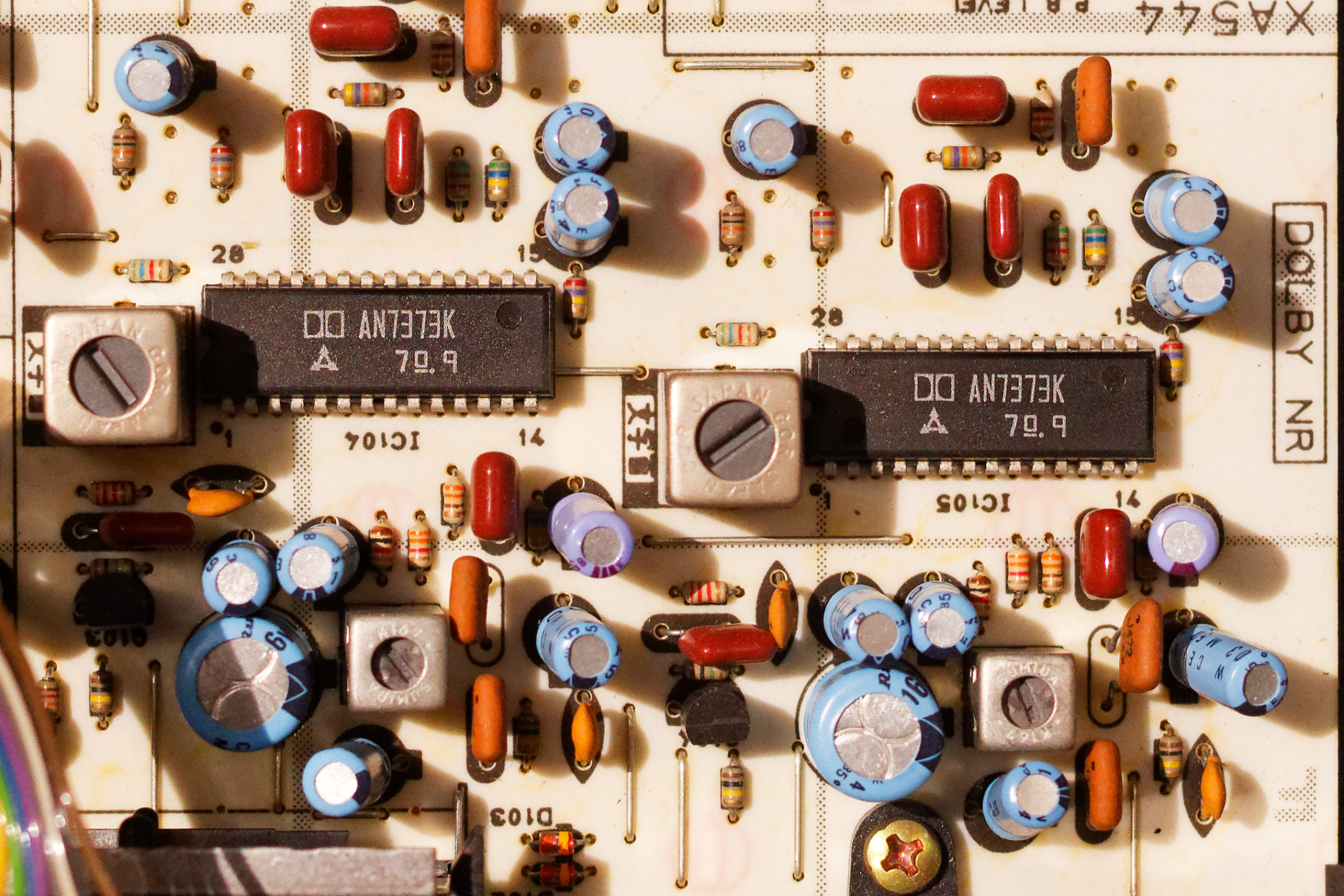
Dolby subcircuit of an entry-level Yamaha deck. Metal cans next to Dolby ICs are complete MPX LC filter assemblies

Residual high-frequency components of the signal remaining after de-multiplexing can be problematic when recording to analog magnetic media. The pilot tone is transmitted at 10% of maximum modulation level and further reduced by 15 db in the receiver to compensate for the pre-emphasis on the transmitting side. High quality FM tuners have built-in MPX filters, which must be very sharp (at least −60 dB rejection at precisely 19 kHz) to be effective.

If, however, no MPX filtering takes place in the tuner, the pilot tone passes through at −35 dB below theoretical maximum. This is sufficient to cause intermodulation distortion with source treble content, and to cause audible beat with the bias oscillator during recording. More importantly, the pilot tone interferes with the proper functioning of reciprocal noise reduction systems, causing audible artefacts such as breathing and pumping For this reason, the MPX filter is mandatory for all cassette recorders equipped with Dolby B and Dolby C systems. On some decks (those capable of recording to 19 kHz) it is usually defeatable, and should be engaged only for recording from FM stereo (but not other sources such as Compact Disc). Sometimes, defeatable MPX filter engages only when noise reduction is enabled. Decks with no MPX filter switch typically have a non-defeatable MPX filter incorporated in their design, which limits the overall (i.e. record to playback) frequency response to about 15–16 kHz.

Cheaper decks may have MPX filtering performed by a low-pass filter that rolls off everything above 15 kHz. A proper MPX filter for quality recording is, at least, a notch filter that will block the 19 kHz pilot tone, and possibly higher frequencies in the 23–53 kHz and 63–75 kHz bands. The difference can be heard when recording from an FM stereo source and engaging and disengaging the MPX filter switch. On a three-head deck with monitoring, this can be heard while recording. The setting of the switch has no effect during playback.
