= FMX (broadcasting) =

Radio noise-reduction technology

FMX Logo

FMX is the name of a commercially unsuccessful noise reduction system developed in the 1980s for FM broadcasting in the United States.

FM stereo broadcasting is known to incur up to a 23 dB noise penalty over that of monophonic FM broadcasting; this is due to the combination of the triangular FM noise spectrum and the wider baseband bandwidth occupied by the stereo multiplex signal. Developed at the CBS Technology Center, FMX was intended to improve this characteristic for listeners in the fringe areas where the noise penalty would be worst. This improvement was achieved by adding an amplitude-compressed version of the L−R (left-minus-right, or difference) signal modulated in quadrature with the stereo subcarrier, using a version of the CX noise-reduction system originally developed at CBS for LP records.

Upon his accession as Chairman of CBS, Laurence Tisch closed the CBS labs in 1986, whereupon the FMX intellectual property was spun off to an investment group, under the name Broadcast Technology Partners (BTP).

With about 50 stations using the technology and perhaps another 50 committed, a controversy emerged in 1989 when MIT professor and Bose Corporation CEO Amar Bose and Bose engineer William Short released a critical study, finding the system to have the potential to "seriously degrade the quality of stereo reception whether received by FMX equipment or not." According to the study, the heavy compression of the L−R audio caused interference in receivers under multipath conditions. A BTP spokesman rebutted the finding, saying that the Bose analysis exaggerated a "worst-case scenario", and actually employed "flawed mathematics" to attempt to prove its point. Perhaps not coincidentally, a patent application filed earlier by Bose disclosed an invention whose implementation was incompatible with the adoption of FMX, while another – filed by Bose and Short around the time of the release of the critical study – sought to improve the performance of FMX under multipath conditions.

Despite industry supporters in both the broadcast and consumer electronics industries, the system never achieved critical mass, and faded into obscurity. However, numerous related patents have since been applied for or granted, referencing the original FMX patents.

== See also ==
- Dolby FM
- High Com FM
