= Signal tone =

A signal tone or signalling tone is a steady or pulsating periodic signal typically in the frequency range of sound for indicating a condition, communication protocol state, or serve as an audible warning. It may be composed of multiple frequency components, or could be a pure tone.

In telephone systems, signaling tones are used as call progress tones for in-band indications to subscribers or operators. Certain telephone switching systems used tones, in-band or out-of-band, for signaling on trunks.

Typical well-known call progress tones are dial tone, ringing tone, busy tone, and the reorder tone. A loud stutter tone is used to alert subscribers of a handset left off-hook, effectively disabling the circuit for receiving calls.

Telephone service subscribers may subscribe to services, such as call forwarding, which may indicate function by a stutter dial tone.

== See also ==
- Musical tone
- Dual-tone multi-frequency signaling (DTMF)
- Signaling (telecommunications)
