= CX (noise reduction) =

Noise reduction system for recorded analog audio

The CX logo, present on LPs and laserdiscs utilizing CX noise reduction

CX is a noise reduction system for recorded analog audio. It was developed by CBS Laboratories (a division of CBS) in the late 1970s as a low-cost competitor to other noise reduction (NR) systems such as dbx disc and High-Com II, and was officially introduced in 1981. The name CX was derived from "Compatible eXpansion", a feature of the technique.

CX is a companding system: the dynamic range of the signal is reduced before being written to the medium, then recovered (expanded) afterwards. Such a combination reduces the effect of noise on the resulting signal and expands the dynamic range that can be practically used. Directly playing the recording without the corresponding expander still results in an acceptable sound, hence the claim of being compatible.

== Use on vinyl LP records ==
CX was originally designed by CBS as a noise-reduction technology for vinyl LP records, similar to the earlier dbx disc (based on dbx II) and High-Com II systems, but, like the later UC system, it aimed at the lower-cost consumer mass market rather than high-end audiophile niche markets only. CX-encoded records required a special CX expander connected to a stereo system, in order to fully reproduce the CX encoded sound on the LP. However, in contrast to dbx disc and High-Com II, CX-encoded records, like UC-encoded records, could also be played without a decoder with a resulting (claimed acceptable) amount of dynamic range compression. CX being a 2:1:2 compander system, a noise reduction of 20 dB(A) was achieved for a resulting maximum dynamic range of typically 80 to 85 dB(A) (other sources claiming up to 95 dB(A) or even 107 dB). The theory of operation is described in U.S. patent 4,376,916.

The project was led by CBS Records group vice president Bob Jamieson and carried out by a team led by Daniel W. Gravereaux and Louis A. Abbagnaro. The label predicted that CX encoding would become standard on all new LP releases, but this did not happen. CBS struggled to gain support for the system from other record companies. The process was controversial among CBS executives and unpopular with some artists. Classical musician Liona Boyd demanded that CBS withdraw the CX encoded version of her album Miniatures for Guitar because of perceived audio shortcomings, even though Jamieson claimed that CBS had the technical means to overcome such objections.

Based on an UREI reference design published by CBS, many third-party builders of CX decoders used a dual operational transconductance amplifier 13700D made by JRC (today NJR), coupled with a pair of quadruple JFET operational amplifier chips TL084 in their designs. Among them were Telefunken with their RN 100 CX, RS 120 CX and RS 220 CX. The documented playback time constants of the decoders were slightly changed by CBS in 1981/1982.

In 1982, the CX integrated circuit U2141B was developed by AEG-Telefunken, Germany, by Ernst F. Schröder, Dietrich Höppner and Kurt Hintzmann, the same team who previously designed the High Com noise reduction system, a broadband compander with up to 20 dB of noise reduction. Hitachi also offered dedicated CX chips named HA12043 (for CX 14) and HA12044 (for CX 20) in 1983.

Approximately 70 CX encoded LP titles were released by CBS up to 1983 in the United States. Gasparo also released a number of CX encoded records. In Europe, many CX discs were manufactured in the Netherlands with the catalog number prefix "CBSCX". The albums in this series also came in standard, non-CX encoded versions. A total of about 150 CX encoded titles exist.

== Use on LaserDisc and CED VideoDisc ==
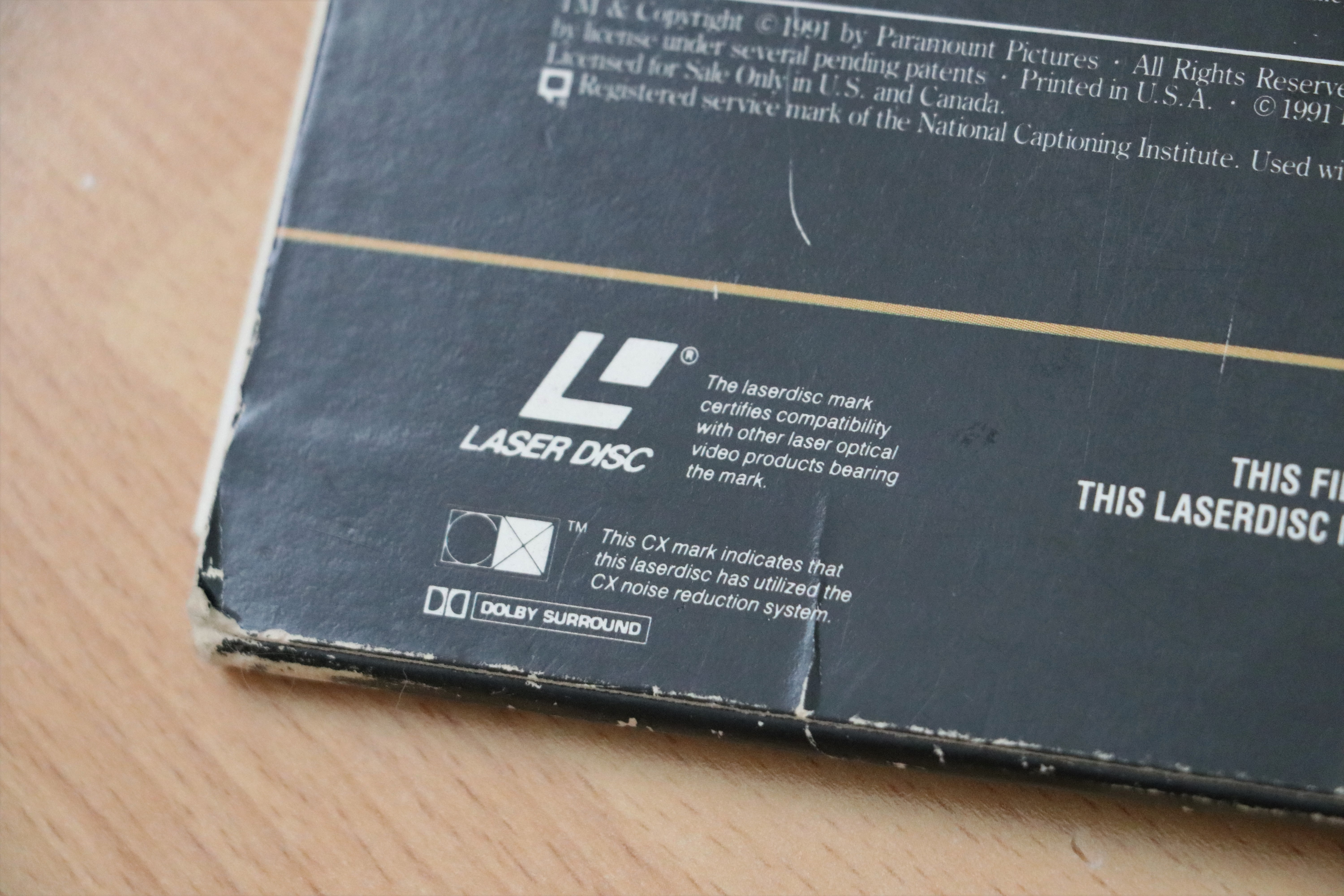
Back of a Laserdisc sleeve, noting the use of CX noise reduction.

While the implementation of CX with LPs was quite unsuccessful and short-lived, CX would later see success as the noise reduction used for the stereo analog audio tracks on the LaserDisc (LD) format. It was also used for the audio tracks on discs of the RCA SelectaVision CED Videodisc system.

All LaserDisc (and stereophonic CED) players manufactured since 1981, when the CX equipped LD-1100 was introduced, had CX noise reduction capability as a standard feature. Pioneer also released a stand-alone CX adapter R-1000 for use with their VP-1000, Magnavox's VH-8000/8005 and the industrial players that were all released before CX was adopted. The first CX encoded LaserDisc was Olivia Newton-John's Olivia Physical, released by MCA Videodisc.

CX decoders made for LPs could not be used with LDs because the CX companding specifications for LaserDisc were changed, from 20 dB of noise reduction to 14 dB, along with moving the 'threshold' where compression/expansion changes from 2:1 to 1:1 from −40 dB to −28 dB - other minor changes to the decoding time constants were made as well. In addition, some of the LaserDisc's FM audio encoding specifications were modified too, allowing more headroom and better high frequency response at high levels. These changes were made because, at the time of CX's adoption on LaserDisc (1981), the vast majority of program sources used for mastering, such as 35 mm optical and magnetic film soundtracks, as well as the 2-inch IVC-9000 and the 1-inch C-Type videotape formats used for LaserDisc mastering, had signal-to-noise ratios low enough that undecoded playback would accentuate their noise to unacceptable levels.

By reducing the total amount of noise reduction and modifying other aspects of the CX system to better match LD's FM audio shortcomings, undecoded playback sound quality was maintained and vastly improved decoded sound was achieved at the same time. The possibility of audible pumping or breathing artifacts during CX decoded playback were reduced as well.

While CX greatly improved the audio quality of LaserDisc's FM audio tracks, its primary reason for adoption was to decrease the amount of interference between the right channel's FM audio carrier and the video carrier's first chroma sideband. Without CX, strict filtering during mastering and playback as well as keeping color saturation below 75% on the master were required to keep any interference below −35 dB, which ensured that no beats or other artifacts were visible in the demodulated image. Although CX improved the picture quality, it was not normally used on discs with mono audio. Pioneer Video, the main manufacturer of LDs at the time, required the studios to request CX and, since most did not know that CX improved the video quality of the finished discs or the audio of mono titles, CX was rarely requested. Due to this lack of knowledge about CX at the studios, there were many stereo titles released without CX encoding and, in fact, CX didn't become standard on all LaserDisc titles until the late 1980s. A look at Pioneer's catalogs as late as 1987 shows that the majority of titles did not have CX encoded analog sound - most were not digital either.

For the CED VideoDisc, since stereo was not added to the format until its second year on the market, RCA made CX a mandatory part of CED's stereo system - a disc could not be released in stereo without CX encoding - and the companding specifications were unchanged from those of the LP system due to the CED system's much higher noise levels than the LaserDisc format. Although RCA improved the plastic/carbon formulation used to make discs, which lowered disc noise levels by 3 dB, and modified the mastering system, the CED format still required the full 20 dB of noise reduction that was achieved with the unmodified LP system.

The names given by CBS to the two different versions of CX were CX-20 and CX-14.

== Use in FM radio broadcasting ==
CX was used in FMX, a commercially unsuccessful noise reduction system developed in the 1980s for FM broadcasting in the United States. FMX was intended to improve fringe area reception of FM stereo by adding a CX-encoded version of the L−R (left-minus-right, or difference) signal modulated in quadrature with the conventional stereo subcarrier. About 50 stations utilized the system, but few FMX-equipped receivers were manufactured, and after FMX was accused in 1989 of actually degrading reception rather than improving it, support dried up and the system was abandoned.

== CX enabled equipment ==
These devices are known to support CX:

- Adcom preamplifier model GFP-1A
- Backes & Müller CX Decoder
- CBS CX Expander Model E-1016
- CBS Technology Center CX Compandor Model 9101
- cm labs cm678 CX decoder
- Elektor CX decoders (DIY projects based on the LM13700D/NE5517N and HA12044)
- Kort Elektronik Dynamik Expander + CX Decoder SR
- phase linear / aie CX Decoder Model 220
- Pioneer CX Decoder R-1000 (external CX 14 expander for LDs)
- Popular Electronics / Phoenix Systems CX decoder by John Roberts (DIY project based on the CA3280)
- Radio-Electronics CX decoder by Joel Cohen (DIY project based on the LM13700)
- Soundcraftsmen Preamplifier Model CX4000
- Soundcraftsmen Differential/Comparator Preamp-Equalizer Model CX4100
- Soundcraftsmen Differential/Comparator Preamp/Equalizer Model CX4200
- Telefunken RN 100 CX (external phono preamp with CX decoder based on LM13700)
- Telefunken RS 120 CX (belt-drive record player with built-in preamp and CX decoder based on the NJM13700D)
- Telefunken RS 220 CX (direct drive record player with built-in preamp and CX decoder)
- Thorens PCX 975 by Heribert Heise (external phone preamp with CX decoder, claiming a dynamic range of up to 107 dB)
- UREI CX Mastering Encoder/Decoder Model 1181 (switchable compander for CX 14 and CX 20 with half-speed mastering option based on Allison Research EGC-101, claiming a dynamic range of up to 95 dB(A))
- CX decoder by Markus Holtwiesche (DIY project based on the HA12044)

The implementation of a software decoder for CX is under consideration.

== CX encoded vinyl records ==
The following vinyl records are known to have been produced in CX encoded editions:

- Liona Boyd - Miniatures for Guitar - CBS Masterworks M 36732 (possibly withdrawn) - 1981
- The Clash - Sandinista! - Epic Records - 1980
- The Clash - Combat Rock - Epic Records - 1982
- Jimmy Cliff - Special - CBS CX 85878 (1982)
- Aaron Copland - Copland Conducts Copland - Columbia Records 33586
- Lacy J. Dalton - 16th Avenue - Columbia Records 37975
- Bob Dylan - Blood on the Tracks - Columbia Records - (1982 re-issue)
- Terumasa Hino - Double Rainbow - Columbia CX 37420
- Julio Iglesias - Momentos - CBS CX 25002
- Billy Joel - 52nd Street - CBS CX 83181
- Billy Joel - Glass Houses - Columbia Records 36384
- Billy Joel - The Nylon Curtain - CBS CX 85959
- Carole King - Tapestry - Epic/Ode Records PE 34946
- Charly McClain - Too Good To Hurry - Epic Records 38064 - 1982
- Frank Marino - Juggernaut - Columbia CXAL 38023
- Johnny Mathis - First 25 Years: Silver Anniversary Album - Columbia Records - (1981)
- Randy Meisner - Randy Meisner - Epic Records - 1982
- Men at Work - Cargo - Columbia Records 38660
- O.M.D. - Orchestral Manoeuvres in the Dark - Dindisc, Virgin Records, Epic Records FE37411 - 1981
- Ozzy Osbourne - Blizzard of Ozz - CBS Associated Z 36812 - 1981
- Marty Robbins - Come Back To Me - Columbia Records FC37995 - 1982
- Freddie Salem & The Wildcats - Cat Dance - Epic Records 38018 - 1982
- Santana - Zebop! - Columbia CX PC 37158 - 1981
- Saxon - Strong Arm of the Law - Carrere CXBL 537679
- Saxon - Denim and Leather - Carrere CXAL 537685
- Simon & Garfunkel - Simon and Garfunkel's Greatest Hits - Columbia Records 31350
- The Sinceros - Pet Rock - 1981
- T.V. Smith's Explorers - The Last Words of the Great Explorer - Epic BL 37432 - 1981
- Translator - Heartbeats And Triggers - 415 Records/Columbia Records - 1982
- Deniece Williams - I'm So Proud - Columbia Records - 1983

== See also ==
- Signal processing
