= Putz (surname) =

Putz or Pütz is a Hungarian surname. Notable people with the name include:

- Amanda Putz (born 1975), Canadian radio presenter
- Eduard Pütz (1911–2000), German composer
- Erny Putz (1917–1995), Luxembourg fencer
- Hans Putz (1920–1990), Austrian actor
- J. J. Putz (born 1977), American baseball player
- Jean Pütz (born 1936), German science journalist
- Kelsey Kollen-Putz (born 1980), American softball player
- Leo Putz (1869–1940), Tyrolean painter

== See also ==
- Kevin Puts
