= Rotel =

Japanese audio equipment manufacturer

- Industry: Electronics
- Founded: 1957
- Founder: Tomoki Tachikawa
- Headquarters: China
- Products: Audio and video equipment
- Owner: Grand Green Ltd. Hongkong, China
- Number of employees: more than 200
- Website: http://rotel.com

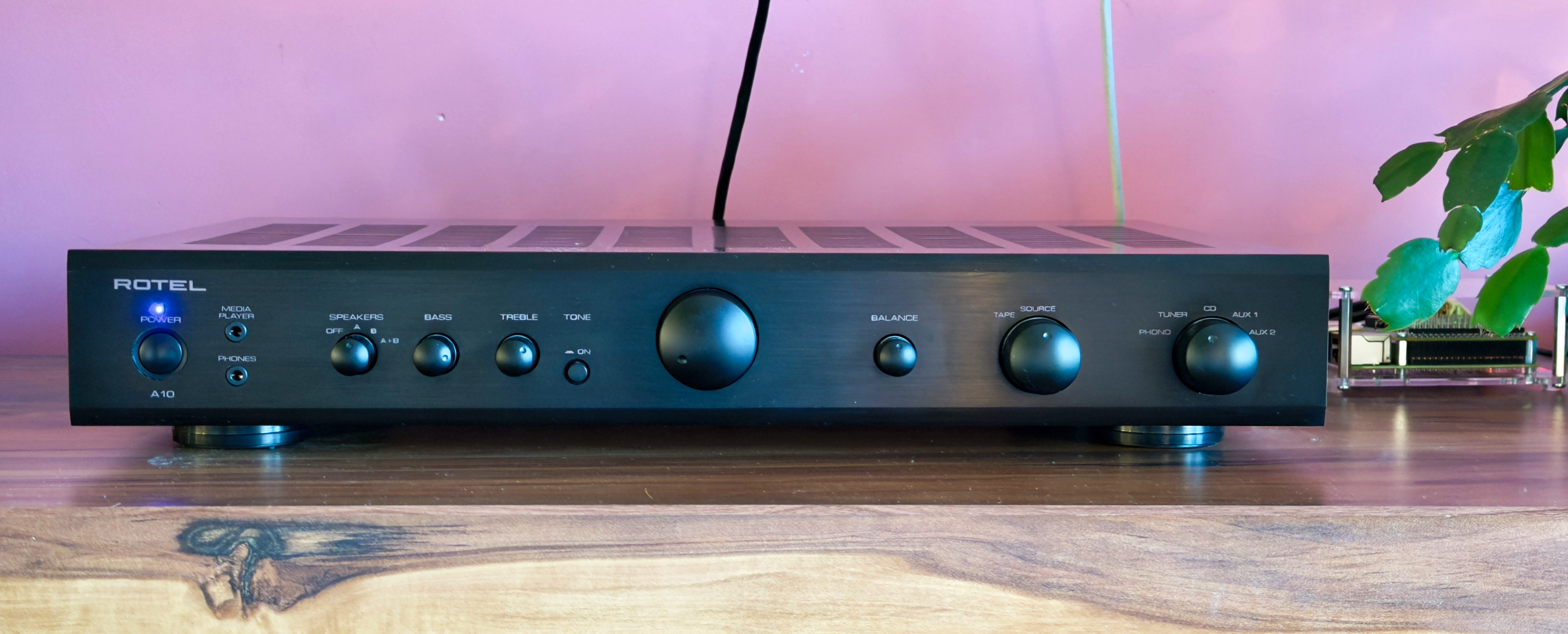
Rotel A10 amplifier

Rotel is a family-owned Japanese manufacturer of hi-fi audio and video equipment: home theater, amplifiers, compact disc players, etc. Rotel was started by Tomoki Tachikawa in Tokyo Japan in 1957 as a hi-fi electronics manufacturer. It is currently run by the nephew, Peter Kao.

In the early 1980s, Rotel joined the B&W Group forming a strategic alliance with Bowers & Wilkins and established exclusive distribution networks in North America and several European markets. Classé Audio later joined the group. Over the next 20 years, Rotel appointed virtually all Bowers & Wilkins distributors globally. In 2000, the B&W Group established Rotel Europe in the UK to consolidate all Rotel sales and support activities outside North America.

The Classé brand was acquired by Sound United in 2018. In October 2020, Sound United LLC also acquired Bowers & Wilkins.

Rotel maintains an exclusive network of specialist hi-fi dealers around the world.
