= Sherman Austin =

American anarchist and musician

- Born: April 10, 1983 (age 43); Los Angeles, California
- Known for: activism

Sherman Martin Austin (born April 10, 1983) is an American anarchist and musician who was arrested for inflammatory content on his website and subsequently convicted. He was the first person to be successfully prosecuted under 18 U.S.C. 842(p), a United States federal law which makes the distribution of information on explosives unlawful if the information is provided with the knowledge or intent that the information will be used to commit a violent federal crime. Austin was convicted under a plea agreement in 2002 and served a one-year sentence in federal prison. Some academics and activists, including Zack de la Rocha of Rage Against the Machine, protested the prosecution of Austin.

== Investigation, conviction and imprisonment ==
=== Background ===
Prior to his arrest and imprisonment, Austin was webmaster of the Internet site RaisetheFist.com (subtitled "National Security is the Threat"), which provides a platform for discussion for anti-police activists, and provides suggestions on how to practice for possible armed combat with police.

On May 1, 2001, the FBI received information about a possible server intrusion and defacement of the Web site of the James Redford Institute for Transplant Awareness. The information contained on that Web site's home page had been deleted and replaced with politically militant rhetoric. In addition, the coding for this and a number of other defaced sites contained links to RaisetheFist.com, while responsibility was claimed by a group calling itself "UCAUN", which was Sherman Austin's personal online username for a number of IRC clients, including AIM Instant Messenger.

=== Conviction ===
On August 4, 2003, after entering a guilty plea under an agreement with the prosecutor, Austin was sentenced in U.S. District Court by Judge Stephen V. Wilson to 12 months in a federal jail, a $2000 fine, and three years probation, and as well as other restrictions. His time was served in a federal institution in Tucson, Arizona.

Austin has claimed that he never authored the explosives information, although he freely hosted it on his webserver. He says he took the plea deal because of the possibility of a 20-year sentence due to a "terrorism enhancement" clause in the USA Patriot Act.

Austin was not indicted for any alleged hacking crimes. However, he has acknowledged defacing the sites, saying it was necessary to get his message out.

=== Release ===
Austin was released one month early in July 2004 with 3 years of probation which prohibited him from having access to a computer or knowingly associating with individuals who "espouse violence for political change".

Following his release from prison, he released a hip-hop CD, Silence is Defeat.

In February 2006, Austin released a statement on Indymedia containing claims that the National Security Agency had installed illegal wiretaps before and during the investigation against him. Several anonymous individuals also relayed information to him regarding "other higher-ups in the government" who had arranged attempts to assassinate him. Austin says although the information wasn't entirely confirmed, anonymous informants provided him with "some detail on who was serving the contracts, names, license plate numbers, etc", by anonymous informants, and that these informants also assured him that he was being "looked out for".

== Criticism of Austin's prosecution ==
Many have questioned whether Austin's trial was fair. Austin's supporters consider him a political prisoner. Since his arrest, Austin has become a cause célèbre on the internet, with many sites dedicated to freeing Austin. Zack de la Rocha, lead vocalist of the band Rage Against the Machine, came out in support of Austin, and other musicians and bands, including Far East Movement and Death to W, supported Austin as well by having a benefit show at the Ché Café in San Diego, CA.

Leslie Kendrick, arguing for the adoption of a standard for determining whether speech is "criminally instructive," has questioned whether Austin's sentence was fair given the available evidence. As she notes, the law protects both (a) speech that is intended to incite a violent crime, but is not actually likely to do so, and (b) speech that is likely to incite a violent crime, but is not actually intended to do so. The Department of Justice prosecutor recommended a sentence of four months in jail and four months in a halfway house, but the judge rejected that plea twice and ordered a twelve-month sentence in jail, saying the prosecution was not "taking this case seriously enough." Writing of Austin, Kendrick says, "Too little information is available to make a complete assessment either of Austin's intent or the likely use of his website by others.… Judge Wilson's difference of opinion with the Justice Department prosecutor (the very agency that had contributed to the drafting of the Feinstein Amendment) illustrates the degree of subjectivity involved in assessing the danger imposed by the activities of individuals like [him]."

Carnegie Mellon University professor David S. Touretzky posted a mirror of the Reclaim Guide on his Web site in reaction to the FBI raid on Austin, in order to prompt public debate. As Touretzky notes on his website, his own distribution of the material does not violate the statute because it is not performed with the intention or knowledge that the information be used to commit any illegal violent acts. On his website, Touretzky distances himself from Austin's politics, which he characterizes as "mindless," and suggests that the hacking evidence alone would be enough to arrest and charge Austin. But he is deeply troubled by the way the government handled the case:

"Did the amateurish bomb-making information, written by a minor, that Mr. Austin allowed to appear on his web site pose any significant threat to public safety? Did he personally intend to promote crimes of violence? Because he was coerced (with the threat of a possible 20 year 'terrorism enhancement') into signing a plea agreement, the government was spared the trouble of a public trial, and thus did not have to prove its case or enter its evidence against him into the public record. How then can we, the American people, judge whether our government acted reasonably in this matter?"

== See also ==
- Internet censorship in the United States
- Nanny state
