= Eumig =

Audio and video producing company

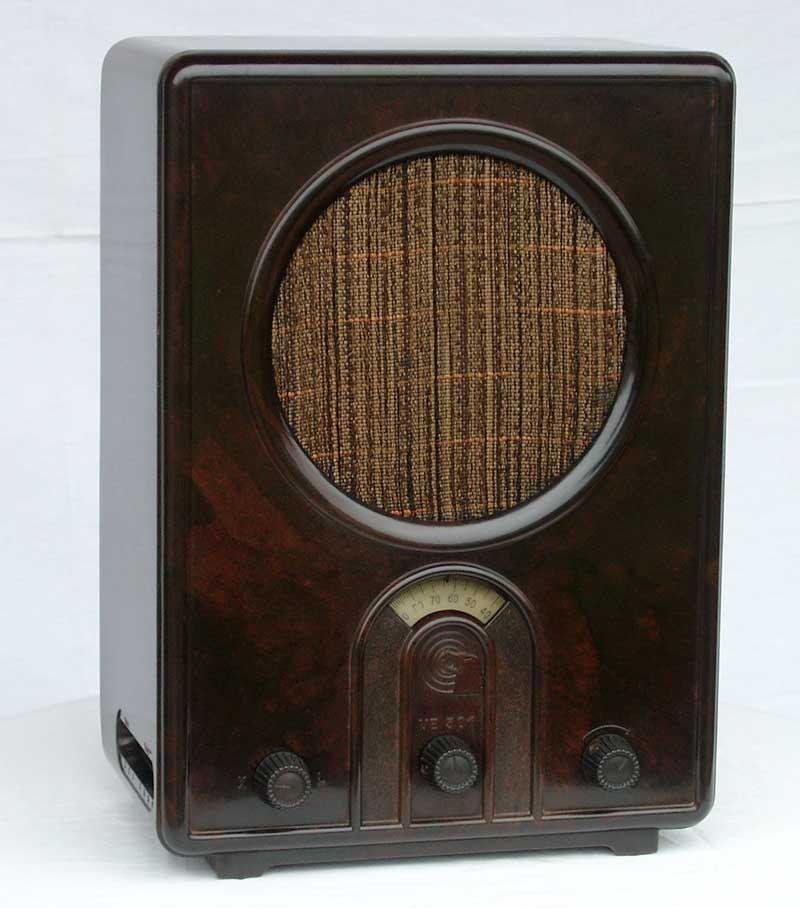
A VE301W model Volksempfänger, or "People's Radio Receiver," produced by EUMIG in the 1930s. The cabinet is made of bakelite, and the speaker screen of silk.

EUMIG was an Austrian company producing audio and video equipment that existed from 1919 until 1982. The name is an acronym for Elektrizitäts und Metallwaren Industrie Gesellschaft, or, translated, the "Electricity and Metalware Industry Company."

== History ==
=== Founding through World War II ===
EUMIG was founded in 1919 in Vienna, Austria, by Karl Vockenhuber, the engineer Alois Handler and Adolf Halpern, who furnished the bulk of the firm's initial financial resources. At its founding, the company produced lighters and cigarette cases and miscellaneous electrical materials. First located at 86 Wienzeile in Mariahilf, the 6th district of Vienna, in the same year EUMIG moved to 42 Schallergasse in the 12th district.

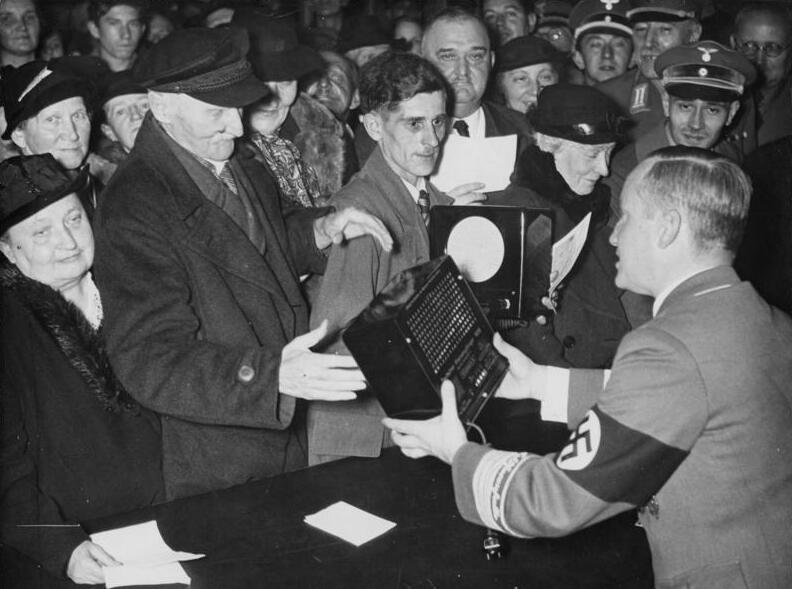
Distribution of 500 small receivers (DKE38) manufactured by EUMIG, on the occasion of Joseph Goebbels' 41st birthday in the Berlin Radio House in October 1938. The Nazi official with swastika armband distributing them is Werner Wächter, the District Manager for Propaganda.

In 1921, the company, now with 65 employees, moved again, to 5 Hirschgasse, back in the Mariahilf. In 1924, EUMIG began manufacturing two models of radios, the "Low Loss Detektor Empfänger" ("Low Loss detector receiver") and a smaller model, the "Eumig Baby." In 1926 Vockenhuber and Handler bought out Halpern, who retired from the company. EUMIG continued production of radio receivers and sound recorders from 1924 until 1962.

In 1928, Eumig began producing film equipment, and three years later, in 1931 it introduced its first film projector, the "Eumig P 1." In 1932, the first movie camera "Eumig C 1" for 9.5-mm film was introduced, and a second model, the "Eumig C 2," also for 9.5-mm film, was introduced in 1935. This was the first movie camera in the world with semi-automatic tracking exposure control. Still expanding, that same year, EUMIG acquired the company Panradio, located at 11-13 Buchengasse, in the 10th district. In 1937 it introduced the movie cameras "Eumig C 3" (propelled by a spring mechanism), and the "Eumig C 4," which was the first amateur film camera in the world driven by electric motor. Overall, about 300,000 units of the C-3-series were built.

During this period, EUMIG benefitted from its employment of some of the best-known European industrial designers, including Walter Maria Kersting. It became the manufacturer of several models of the well-known Volksempfänger or "People's Radio," that the Nazis used to reach and control a huge audience throughout Germany in the 1930s and 1940s.

By 1941 EUMIG had grown to 1,000 employees, and during the war years, in addition to radios and cameras EUMIG also produced military equipment. Its factory on the Buchengasse in Vienna was destroyed in 1945 by bombing, but machinery had been moved the previous year to a branch in Micheldorf.

=== Postwar Era, 1945-1979 ===
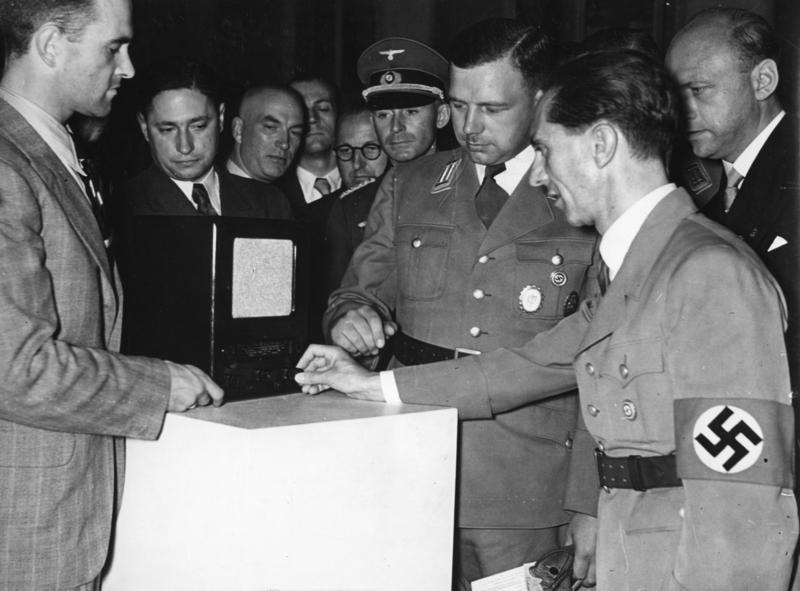
Joseph Goebbels examining a EUMIG Volksempfänger at the Internationale Funkausstellung Berlin ("[International] Berlin Radio Show") in August 1938

Despite the slow economic recovery after the destruction of the Second World War, EUMIG continued to develop new lines of equipment in the 1950s. In 1951 Charles Vockenhuber died, the same year that EUMIG began producing individual photographic cameras, introducing the "Eumigetta" for 6 x 6 cm rolls of film. Two years later, its successor, the "Eumigetta 2," debuted, though these cameras were eventually abandoned. 1954 saw the introduction of the projector Eumig P 8, the world's first home movie projector with a low voltage lighting system (12 volts). In 1955, EUMIG released its most successful radio model, the "Eumigette," which featured 7 tubes for FM and AM frequencies, ultimately producing approximately 500,000 units.

1956 was a landmark year for EUMIG. It built a new factory complex, designed by Oswald Haerdtl, on a site in Wiener Neudorf. Then, on the initiative of junior engineer Karl Vockenhuber, and after 6-week trials and a subsequent survey of the workforce, EUMIG introduced the first 40-hour work week in Austria. Finally, the C(amera) 16 was introduced for 16-mm film. In 1958, in recognition of its accomplishments, the company received the Staatliche Auszeichnung ("National Award") and was allowed to use the Bundeswappen, or the federal arms of Austria, in commercial transactions.

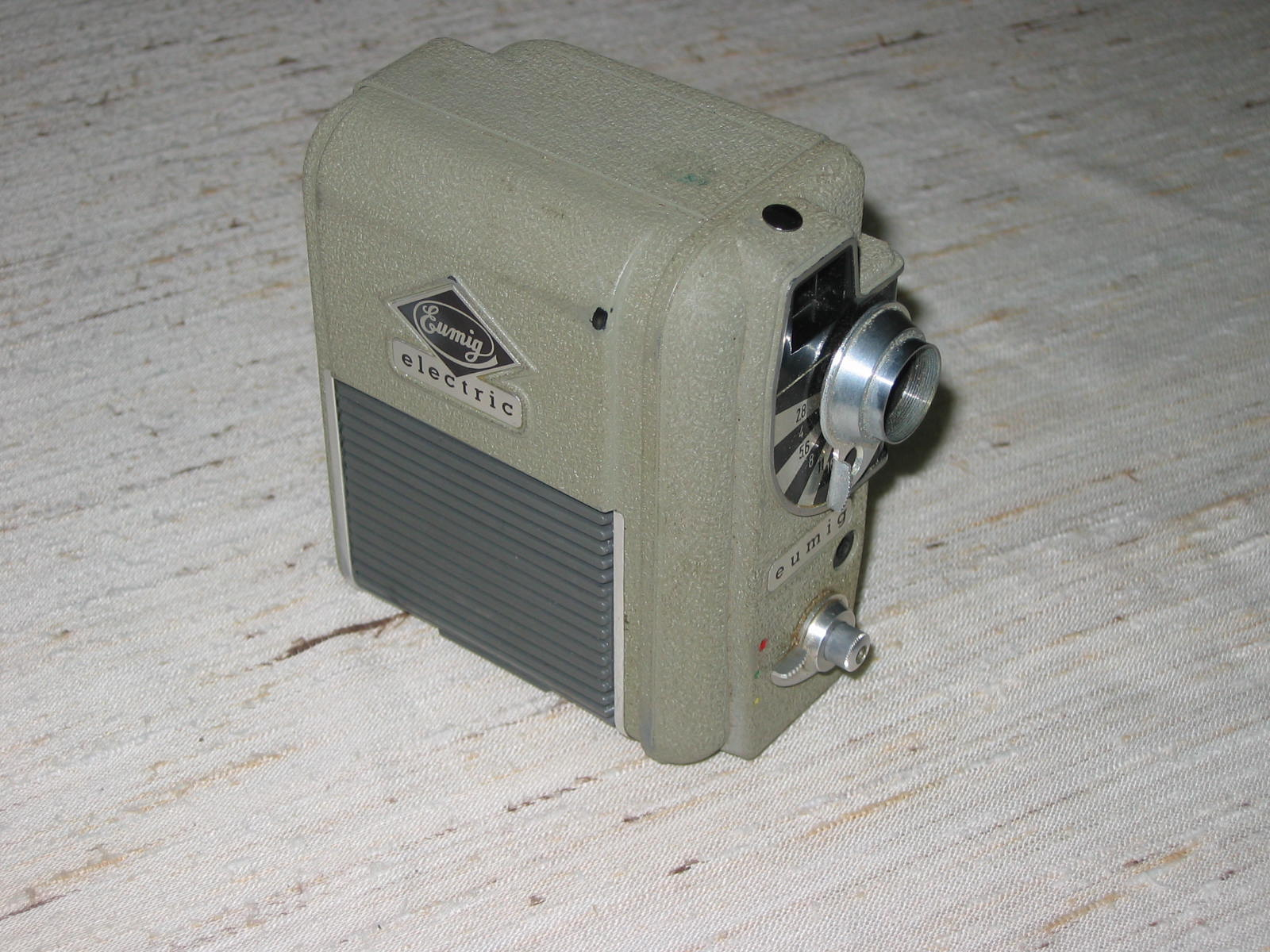
A EUMIG 8mm movie camera from about 1955

In 1960 Alois Handler, the last of the three original founders, died. EUMIG's postwar innovations continued, with 3,000 employees in 1961. In 1962, the radio production was abandoned and sold to HEA, after EUMIG had cumulatively sold some 3 million radios. The company then focused on the construction of movie cameras and projectors at its two plants in the Neudorf and Furstenfeld sections of Vienna.

After Kodak (USA) introduced Super-8 film, in 1965 EUMIG launched the movie camera "Viennette Super-8" and the projectors "Mark M Super-8" with threader and arrest projection and "Eumig Mark S Super-8" for Super-8 sound film. At the time, EUMIG was the only European manufacturer with a complete range of equipment for Super-8 film. In 1969, it expanded again, acquiring the Swiss company Bolex, before introducing the Eumig Movie Camera "mini" in 1971. It would go on to produce about 500,000 units of the mini series. In 1973, EUMIG introduced the silent film projector "Mark 610 D" (switchable for Regular 8 and Super 8 film), which was sold in a similar form as Bolex 18-3 Duo and the Revuelux 3003.

In 1974, the Executive Board of the Vienna Buchengasse moved to a new high-rise next to the factory in Neudorf. By 1975 EUMIG had become the largest film projector manufacturer in the world, turning out some 500,000 projectors a year, and employing some 5,000 people. In 1976, EUMIG entered into a contract with Polaroid (USA) for the production of instant film Polavision devices The system consisted of the camera, the presenter and film, delivered in special cassettes, that could be developed immediately after exposure and demonstrated after only 90 seconds. Two years later, however, EUMIG had to lay off 1,000 employees after Polaroid stopped its orders for Polavision.

In 1977 Eumig tried again in the radio hifi industry and introduced the 3-head stereo cassette deck "Metropolitan CCD", with a tuner and amplifier as a "Metropolitan CC" in a console design, with fully electronic sensor control and opto-electronic synchronization control. In 1979, EUMIG began working on a portable video recorder, first developed by BASF for the LVR system (Longitudinal Video Recording, wherein the recording is carried out in 48 parallel tracks). But later that year, the LVR project was discontinued, as the market opportunities were considered to be too few. The CCD won the "Award for Design and Engineering" at the Consumer Electronics Show (CES) in Chicago in 1979, where none of the Japanese devices shown had a similar functionality to EUMIG's.

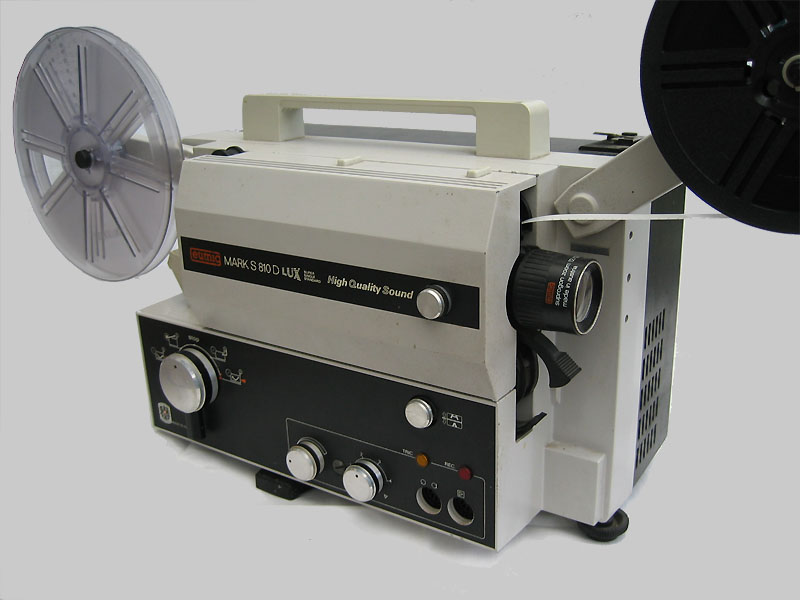
A EUMIG Mark S810 Super 8 movie sound projector

The Eumig FL-1000uP cassette deck came out in 1979, replacing the Metropolitan Series. It used a microprocessor, the Mostek MK3870. It had a more advanced drive than the Metropolitan, with a front loading design in which the winding speed was electronically governed at Rewind (short rewind time), and was able to tape media positions accurately with an electronic counter, with an extremely short acceleration time. The built-interface could control up to sixteen decks from a computer. Also that year, Eumig launched the waterproof film camera "Nautica" for Super 8, usable up to 40 meters below the surface.

In 1980 Eumig had 3000 employees. That year it launched the two film cameras "Eumig Sound 125 XL" and "Eumig Sound 128 XL" for Super-8 sound film, which were the only sound film cameras EUMIG would produce itself. Previously, it had purchased sound film cameras from Bell & Howell.

=== Abrupt End, 1980-82 ===
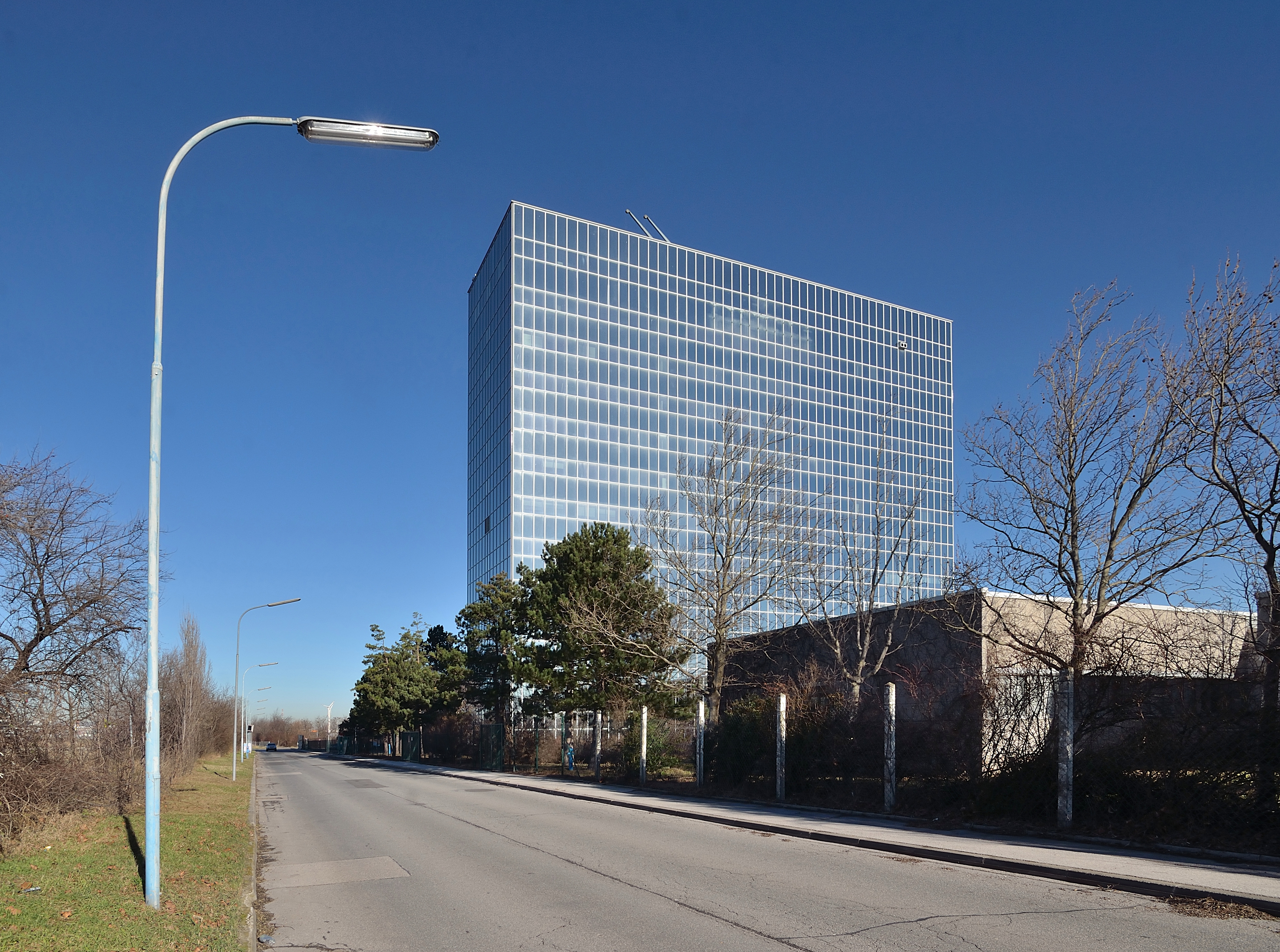
Eumig Hochhaus, in the industry zone of Wiener Neudorf, was created for Eumig in 1956

In 1981, EUMIG sold the development branch for SMD technology to the company Schrack. Soon afterwards, the Länderbank stopped the further financing of EUMIG, and the company terminated production of hi-fi equipment. In 1982 the company declared bankruptcy and began liquidating its assets. The EUMIG skyscraper in Neudorf was sold to Palmers AG, while the brand name "EUMIG" was sold to the Luxembourg company Interbasic. The EUMIG patent for the macro system in lenses was sold to the Japanese company Canon. The Fohnsdorf factory was taken over by AT&S (Austria Technologie & Systemtechnik). The bankruptcy process was completed in 1985. In 1989 the German company Rothenberger GmbH, Frankfurt, acquired the rights to the EUMIG name for the production of cameras and audio and video systems, and today it is under the name EUMIG industry-tv GmbH Environmental products for the channel and tube businesses are sold.

=== Museum ===
The Eumig Museum is in Wiener Neudorf.
