= Jean Pütz =

German science journalist and TV host

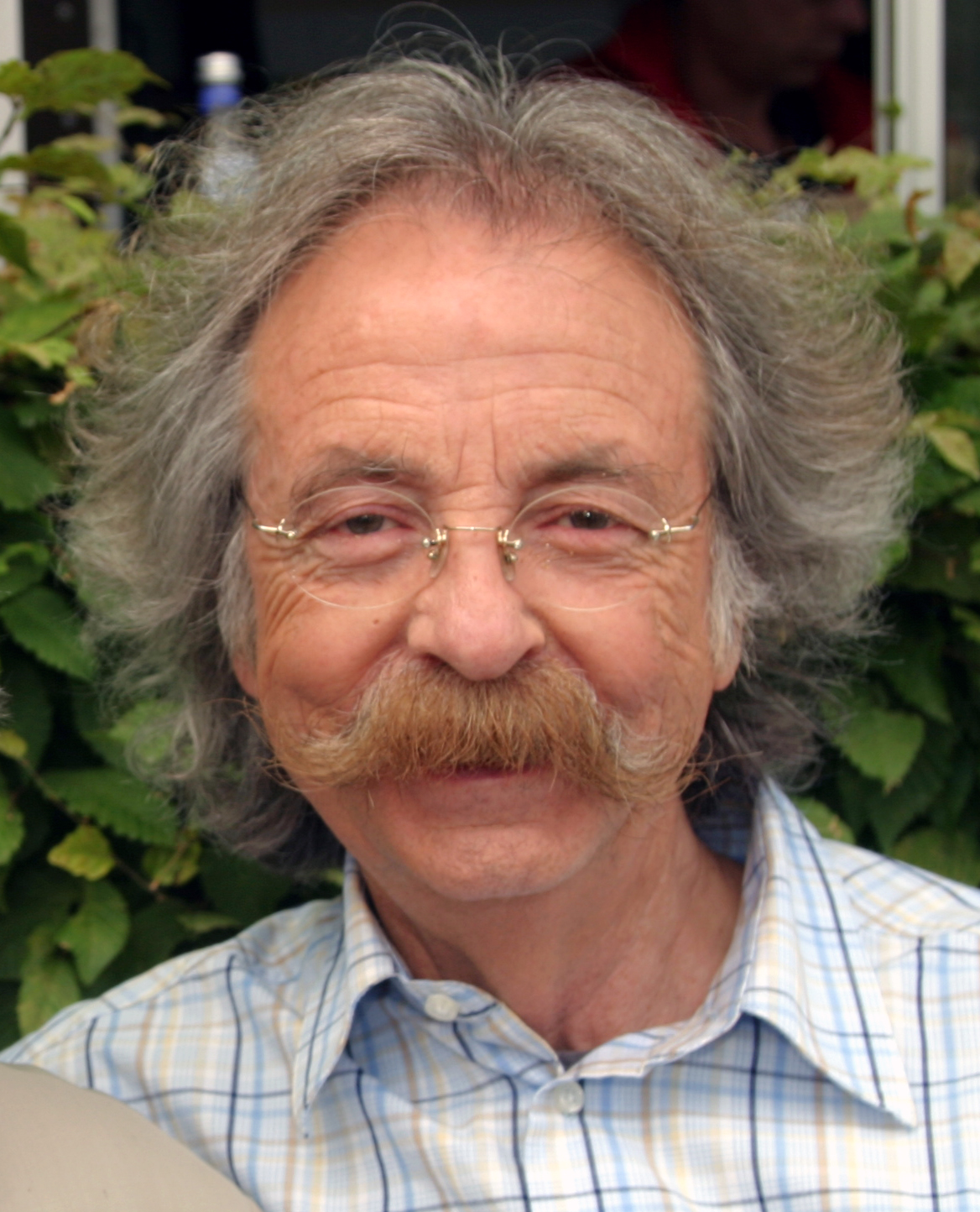
- Pütz in 2002
- Born: 21 September 1936 (age 88); Cologne, Germany
- Occupation(s): German/Luxembourgish science journalist and television host
- Website: https://jean-puetz.net/

Jean Pütz (born 21 September 1936) is a German science journalist and TV host.

== Life ==
Pütz was born in Cologne. He originally took an education as an electrician before completing his Abitur, after which he studied physics, mathematics, sociology, and national economy. In 1970, he became a regular host on science shows on WDR Fernsehen.

He is mainly known for his show Hobbythek which ran for nearly 30 years, from 1974 up to 2004, on the channels WDR and NDR Fernsehen, where he explained scientific phenomena with an emphasis upon do it yourself, environmentally-friendly homemade solutions for everyday health and household problems. Over the decades, the Hobbythek show spawned a series of 56 Hobbythek books by Pütz, containing the most popular household tips from the show the written instructions of which were most frequently requested by letter from viewers. Beside the Hobbythek books, Pütz also authored more than 20 other guidebooks dedicated to health, food, gardening, popular science, nature, and do-it-yourself hobbies.

The end of Hobbythek in 2004 came unconsensually, when Pütz's show was cancelled against his own intentions by his former protégé Ranga Yogeshwar, now head of WDR's science department. Since 2004, Pütz travels extensively throughout Germany and abroad with a stage show called Pützmunter (a pun upon his last name with the German adjective putzmunter meaning "lively", "full of beans") which is based in concept upon his old Hobbythek show. In 2007, he started his new show TechniThek on TechniTipp-TV.

== See also ==
- HobbyCom
