= Reference tone =

Pure audio tone at stable frequency and volume

A reference tone is a pure tone corresponding to a known frequency, and produced at a stable sound pressure level (volume), usually by specialized equipment.

== In media ==
The most common reference tone in audio engineering is a 1000 Hz tone at −20dB. It is meant to be used by audio engineers in order to adjust the playback equipment so that the accompanying media is at a comfortable volume for the audience. In video production, this tone is usually accompanied by a test card so the video programming may be calibrated as well. It is sometimes played in sequence between a 100 Hz and 10 kHz tone to ensure an accurate response from the equipment at varying audio frequencies. This is also the "bleep" tone commonly used to censor obscene or sensitive audio content.

== In music ==
Many electronic tuners used by musicians emit a tone of 440Hz, corresponding to a pitch of A above Middle C (A4). More sophisticated tuners offer a choice of other reference pitches to account for differences in tuning. Some specialized tuners offer pitches used commonly on a particular instrument (standard guitar tuning, fifth intervals for string instruments, the open tones for various brass instruments).

== In telecommunications ==
In telecommunication, a standard test tone is a pure tone with a standardized level generally used for level alignment of single links and of links in tandem.

For standardized test signal levels and frequencies, see MIL-STD-188-100 for United States Department of Defense (DOD) use, and the Code of Federal Regulations Title 47, part 68 for other Government agencies.
