= Sabin (unit) =

Unit of sound absorption

The sabin

In acoustics, the sabin (or more precisely the square meter or foot sabin) is a unit of sound absorption, used for expressing the total effective absorption for the interior of a room. Sound absorption can be expressed in terms of the percentage of energy absorbed compared with the percentage reflected. It can also be expressed as a coefficient, with a value of 1.00 representing a material which absorbs 100% of the energy, and a value of 0.00 meaning all the sound is reflected.

The concept of a unit for absorption was first suggested by American physicist Wallace Clement Sabine, the founder of the field of architectural acoustics. He defined the "open-window unit" as the absorption of 1 square foot (0.093 m^{2}) of open window. The unit was renamed the sabin after Sabine, and it is now defined as "the absorption due to unit area of a totally absorbent surface".

Sabins may be calculated with either imperial or metric units. One square foot of 100% absorbing material has a value of one imperial sabin, and 1 square metre of 100% absorbing material has a value of one metric sabin.

The total absorption A in metric sabins for a room containing many types of surface is given by
$$A = S_1 \alpha_1 + S_2 \alpha_2 + \ldots + S_n \alpha_n = \sum S_i \alpha_i ,$$
where S_{1}, S_{2}, ..., S_{n} are the areas of the surfaces in the room (in m^{2}), and α_{1}, α_{2}, ..., α_{n} are the absorption coefficients of the surfaces.

Sabins are used in calculating the reverberation time of concert halls, lecture theatres, and recording studios.

The absorption coefficients used to calculate sabins are determined through standardized laboratory measurements. ISO 354 specifies a reverberation room procedure in which a sample of the material is placed in a large reverberant chamber and the change in reverberation time is measured to derive the random-incidence absorption coefficient. Because this method can yield coefficient values slightly greater than 1.00 for certain materials at some frequencies, the resulting equivalent absorption area in sabins may exceed the physical surface area of the specimen. ISO 10534-2 provides an alternative impedance tube method for measuring the absorption coefficient at normal incidence, though the resulting values are not directly interchangeable with those from ISO 354.

The total absorption in sabins is used in the Sabine equation to estimate the reverberation time of an enclosed space:

$$T_{60} = \frac{0.161 V}{A}$$

where V is the room volume in cubic metres and A is the total absorption in metric sabins. At higher frequencies, absorption by the air itself becomes significant and an additional term for air absorption must be included in the calculation of A.

== Sources ==
- Davis, Don; Davis, Caroline (1975). Sound System Engineering (2nd ed.). Indianapolis: H. W. Sams. ISBN 978-0-672-21156-0.
- Moore, John Edwin (1979). Design for Good Acoustics and Noise Control. London: Macmillan. ISBN 978-03332-4-293-3.
