= Omnidirectional antenna =

Radio antenna that sends signals in every direction

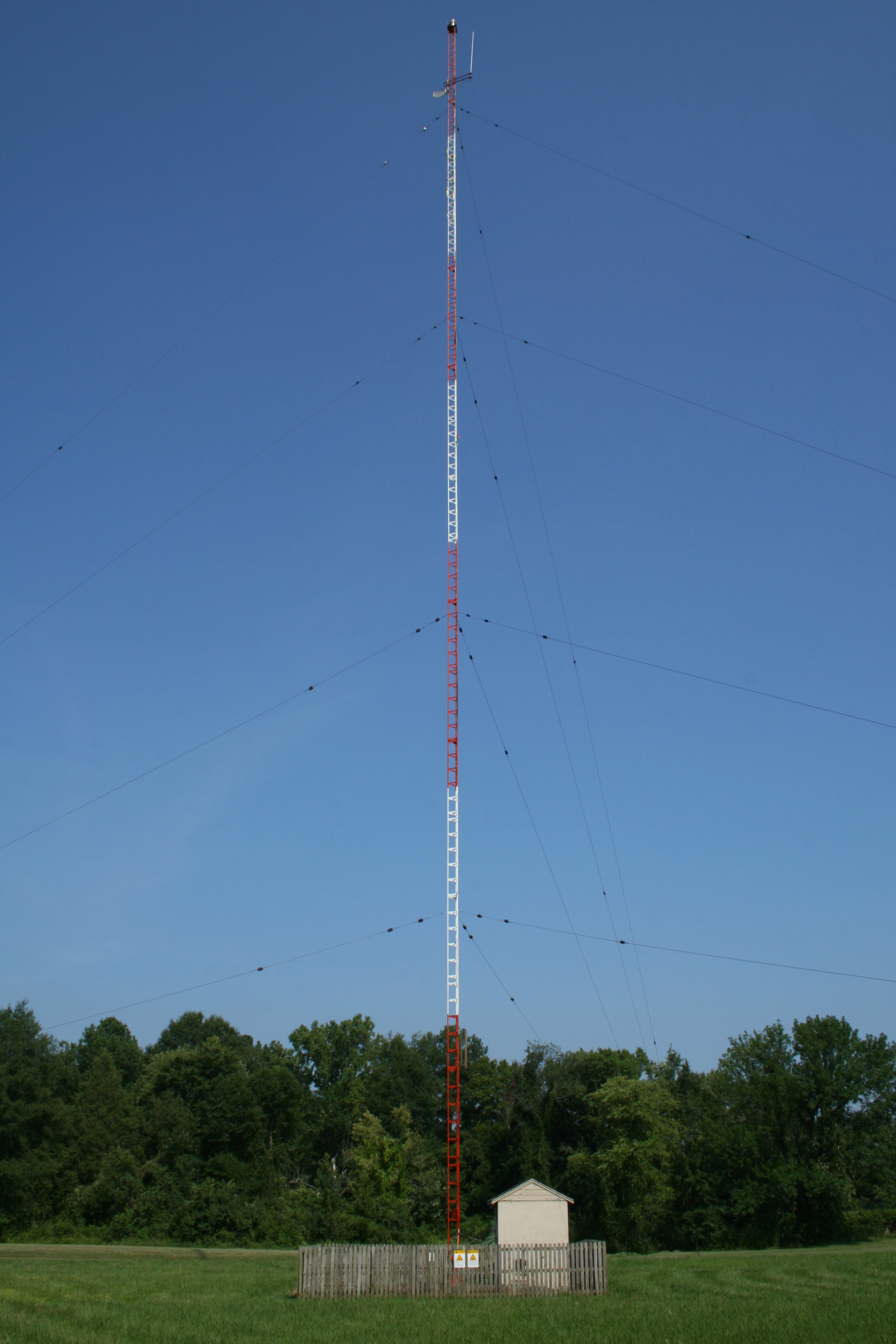
Mast radiator antenna of AM radio station

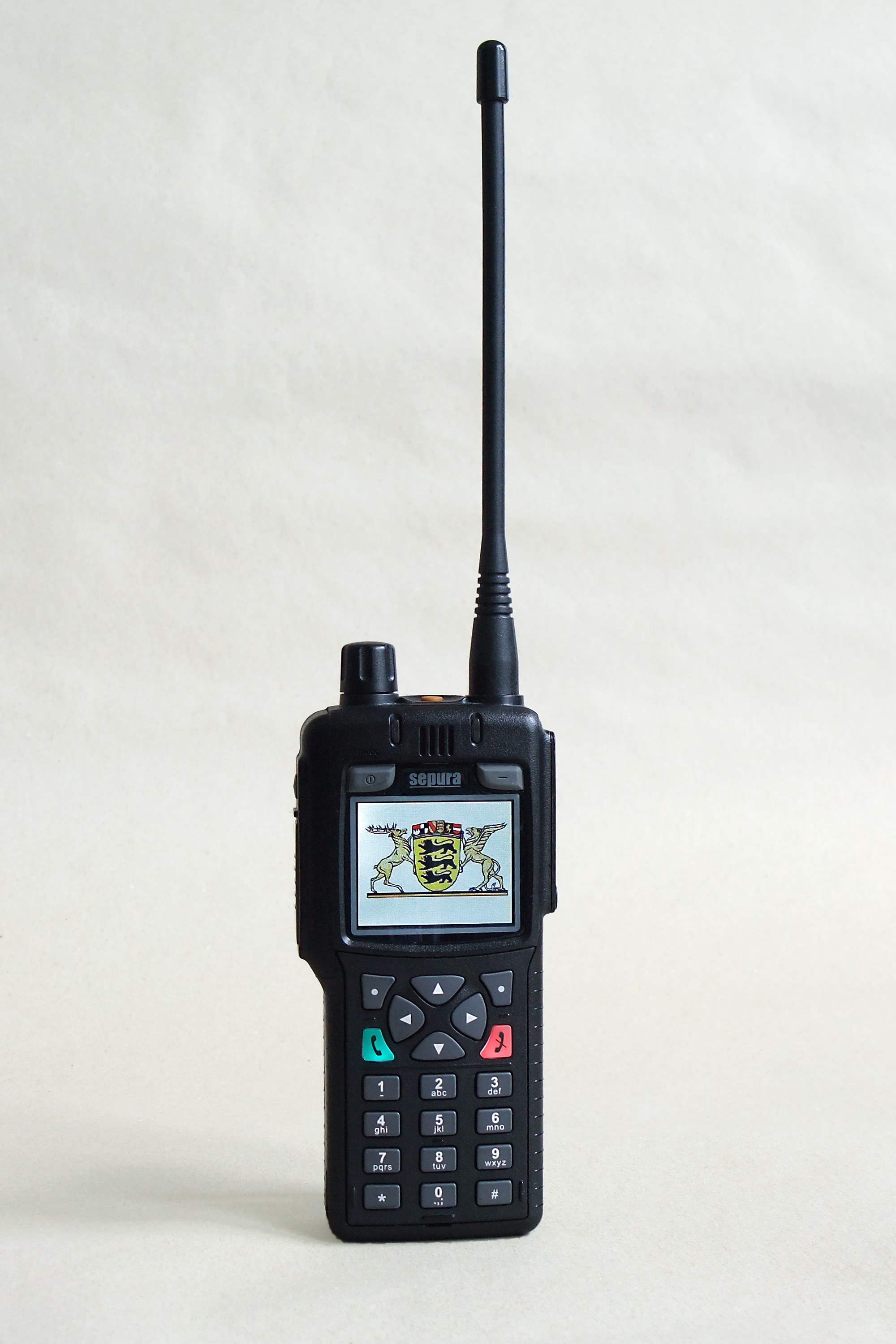
Whip antenna on a walkie-talkie

In radio communication, an omnidirectional antenna is a class of antenna which radiates equal radio power in all directions perpendicular to an axis (azimuthal directions), with power varying with angle to the axis (elevation angle), declining to zero on the axis. When graphed in three dimensions (see graph) this radiation pattern is often described as doughnut-shaped. This is different from an isotropic antenna, which radiates equal power in all directions, having a spherical radiation pattern. Omnidirectional antennas oriented vertically are widely used for nondirectional antennas on the surface of the Earth because they radiate equally in all horizontal directions, while the power radiated drops off with elevation angle so little radio energy is aimed into the sky or down toward the earth and wasted.

Omnidirectional antennas are widely used for radio broadcasting antennas, and in mobile devices that use radio such as cell phones, FM radios, walkie-talkies, wireless computer networks, cordless phones, GPS, as well as for base stations that communicate with mobile radios, such as police and taxi dispatchers and aircraft communications.

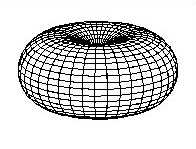
The radiation pattern of a simple omnidirectional antenna, a vertical half-wave dipole antenna. In this graph the antenna is at the center of the "donut," or torus. Radial distance from the center represents the power radiated in that direction. The power radiated is maximum in horizontal directions, dropping to zero directly above and below the antenna.

Animation of an omnidirectional half-wave dipole antenna transmitting radio waves. The antenna in the center is two vertical metal rods, with an alternating current applied at its center from a radio transmitter (not shown). Loops of electric field (black lines) leave the antenna and travel away at the speed of light; these are the radio waves. This diagram only shows the radiation in a single plane through the axis, the radiation is symmetrical about the antenna's vertical axis.

== Types ==
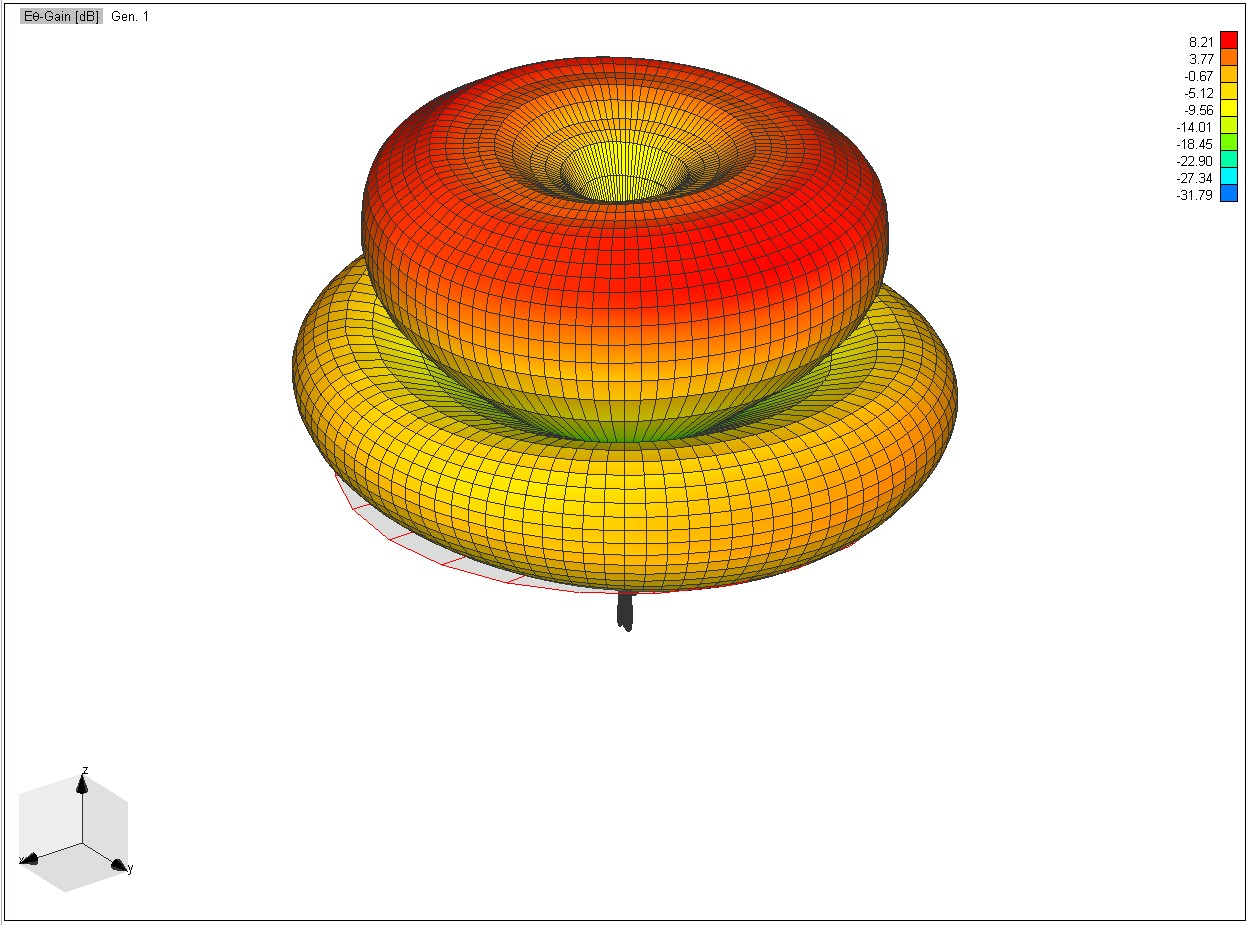
Radiation pattern of a 3 / 2 λ monopole antenna. Although the radiation of an omnidirectional antenna is symmetrical in azimuthal directions, it may vary in a complicated way with elevation angle, having lobes and nulls at different angles.

The most common omnidirectional antenna designs are the monopole antenna, consisting of a vertical rod conductor mounted over a conducting ground plane, and vertical dipole antenna, consisting of two collinear vertical rods. The quarter-wave monopole and half-wave dipole both have vertical radiation patterns consisting of a single broad lobe with maximum radiation in horizontal directions, so they are popular. The quarter-wave monopole, the most compact resonant antenna, may be the most widely used antenna in the world. The five-eighth wave monopole – length 0.625 λ , or 5 / 8 of a wavelength – is also popular, since at that length monopoles direct the greatest proportion of their radiated power horizontally, hence the best use of transmit power for long-distance communication.

Common types of low-gain omnidirectional antennas are the whip antenna, "Rubber Ducky" antenna, ground plane antenna, vertically oriented dipole antenna, discone antenna, mast radiator, horizontal loop antenna (sometimes known colloquially as a 'circular aerial' because of the shape) and the halo antenna.

Higher-gain omnidirectional antennas can also be built. "Higher gain" in this case means that the antenna radiates less energy at higher and lower elevation angles and more in the horizontal directions. High-gain omnidirectional antennas are generally realized using collinear dipole arrays. These consist of multiple half-wave dipoles mounted collinearly (in a line), fed in phase.

- The coaxial collinear (COCO) antenna uses transposed coaxial sections to produce in-phase half-wavelength radiators.
- A Franklin array uses short U-shaped half-wavelength sections whose radiation cancels in the far-field to bring each half-wavelength dipole section into equal phase.
- Another type is the omnidirectional microstrip antenna (OMA).

== Analysis ==
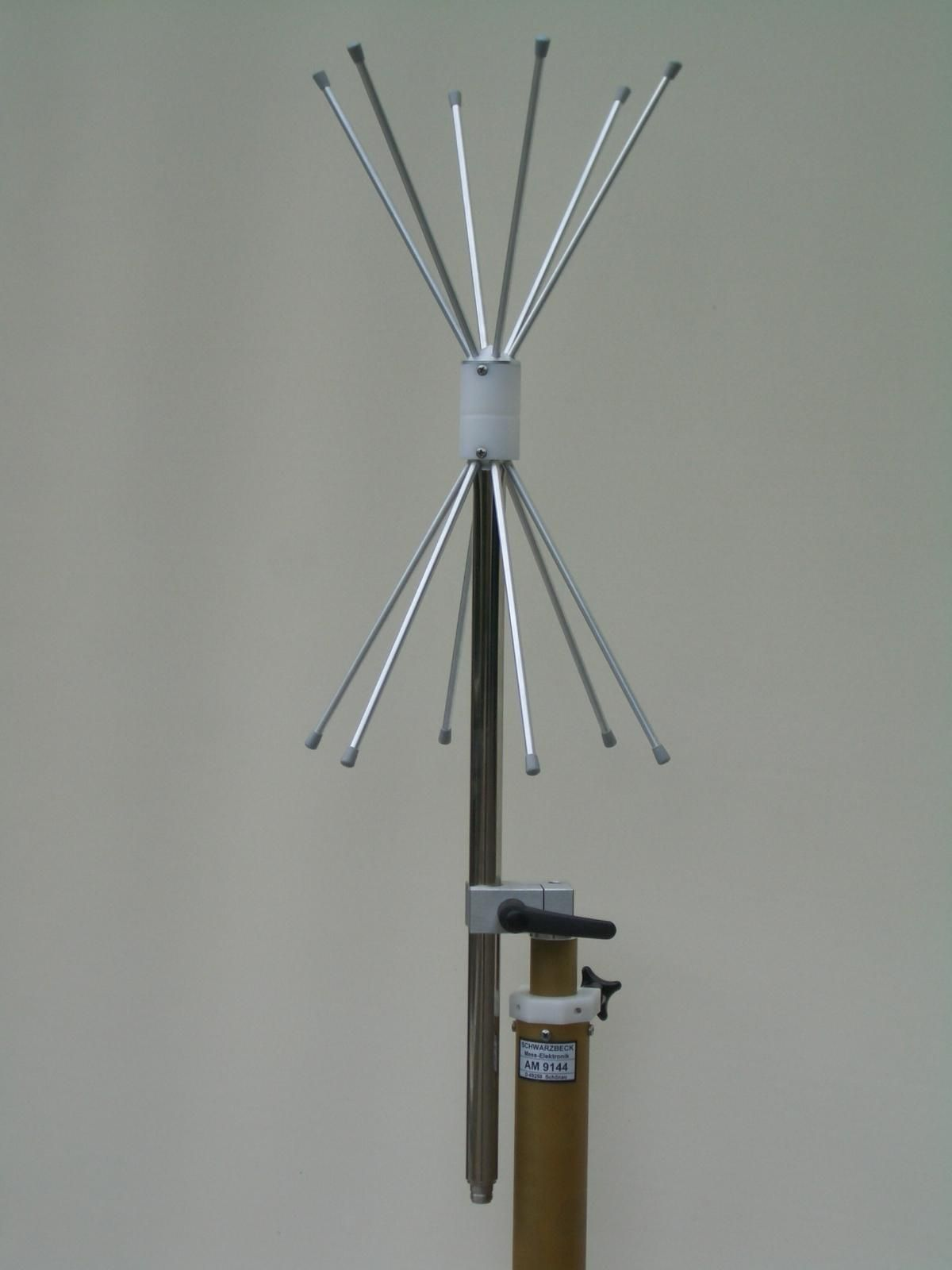
Vertical polarized VHF-UHF biconical antenna 170–1100 MHz with omnidirectional H-plane pattern

Omnidirectional radiation patterns are produced by the simplest practical antennas, monopole and dipole antennas, consisting of one or two straight rod conductors on a common axis. Antenna gain (G) is defined as antenna efficiency (e) multiplied by antenna directivity (D) which is expressed mathematically as: $G = eD$. A useful relationship between omnidirectional radiation pattern directivity (D) in decibels and half-power beamwidth (HPBW) based on the assumption of a $\sin(b\theta) / {b\theta}$ pattern shape is:

$$D \approx 10 \log_{10} \left(\frac{101.5}{\text{HPBW} - 0.00272\, \text{HPBW}^2}\right)\ \text{ dB}.$$

== See also ==
- Choke ring antenna
- Directional antenna
