= Line array =

Loudspeaker system composed of linearly-mounted, in-phase speakers

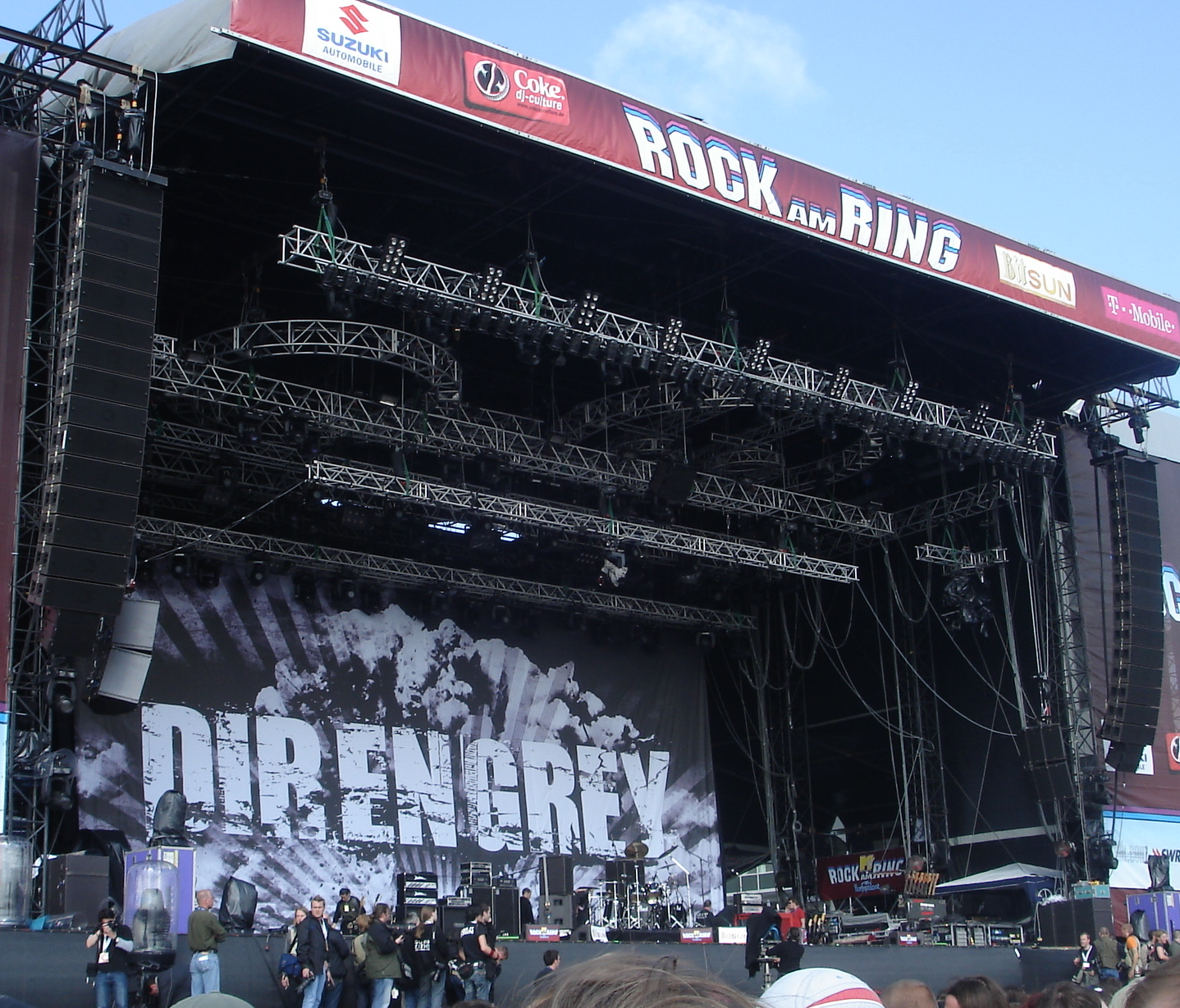
Center stage of German Rock am Ring music festival with two line arrays of 6 metres (20 ft) height each

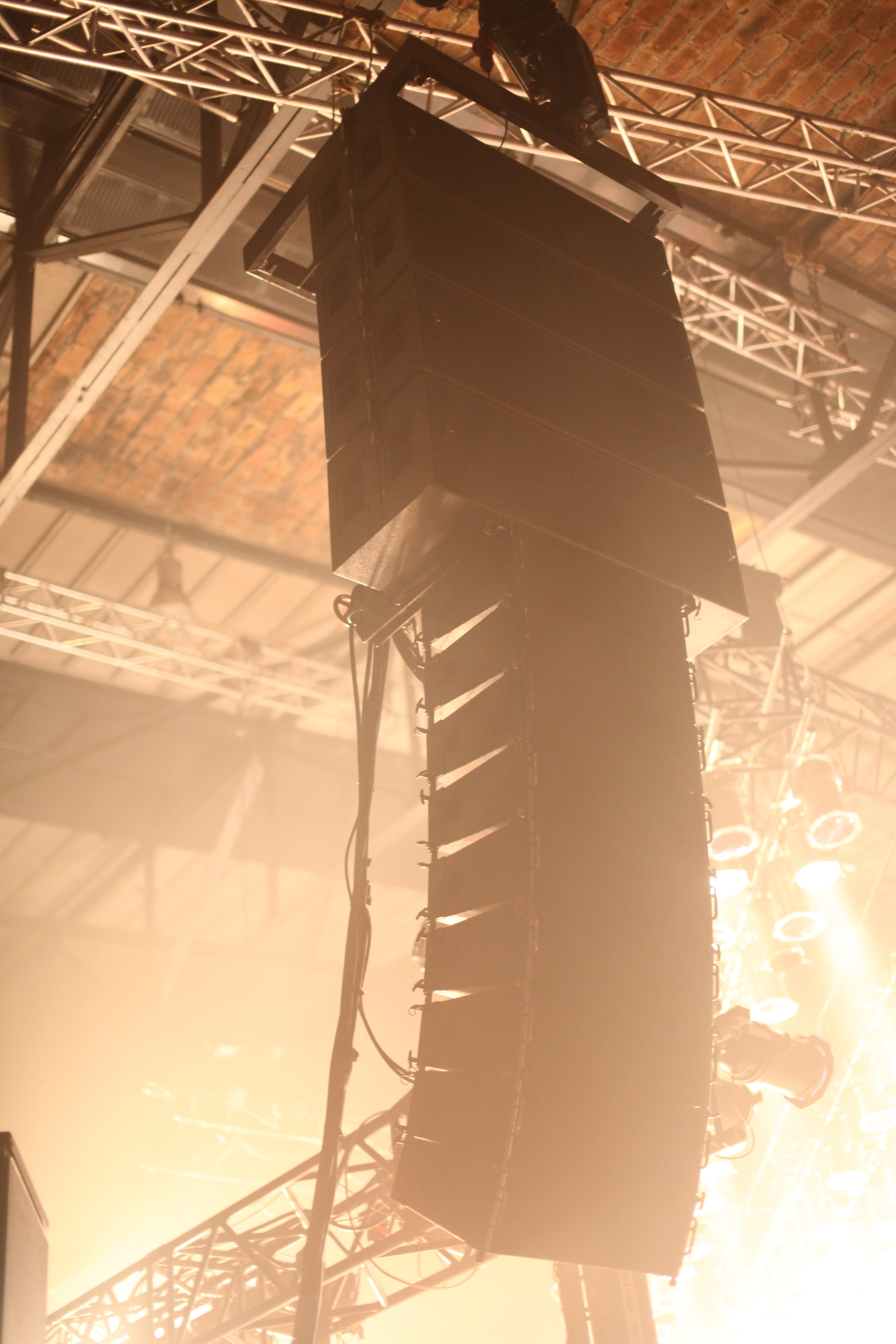
L-Acoustics V-DOSC/dV-DOSC line array at a concert

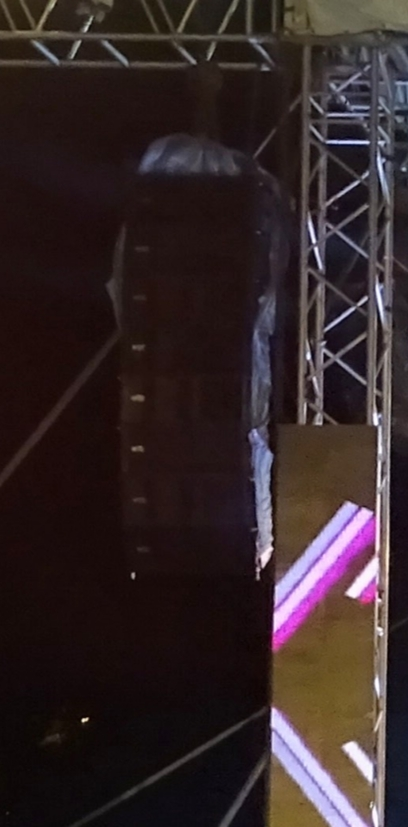
NEXO STM M28 Line array at EXPO Festival.

A line array is a loudspeaker system that is made up of a number of usually identical loudspeaker elements mounted in a line and fed in phase, to create a near-line source of sound. The distance between adjacent drivers is close enough that they constructively interfere with each other to send sound waves farther than traditional horn-loaded loudspeakers, and with a more evenly distributed sound output pattern.

Line arrays can be oriented in any direction, but their primary use in public address is in vertical arrays which provide a very narrow vertical output pattern useful for focusing sound at audiences without wasting output energy on ceilings or empty air above the audience. A vertical line array displays a normally wide horizontal pattern useful for supplying sound to the majority of a concert audience. By contrast, horizontal line arrays have a very narrow output pattern horizontally but a tall pattern vertically. A row of subwoofers along the front edge of a concert stage can behave as a horizontal line array unless the signal supplied to them is adjusted (delayed, polarized, equalized) to shape the pattern otherwise. Loudspeakers can be designed to be arrayed horizontally without behaving as a horizontal line source.

Modern line arrays use separate drivers for high-, mid- and low-frequency passbands. For the line source to work, the drivers in each passband need to be in a line. Therefore, each enclosure must be designed to rig together closely to form columns composed of high-, mid- and low-frequency speaker drivers. Increasing the number of drivers in each enclosure increases the frequency range and maximum sound pressure level, while adding additional boxes to the array will also lower the frequency in which the array achieves a directional dispersion pattern.

The large format line array has become the standard for large concert venues and outdoor festivals, where such systems can be flown (rigged, suspended) from a structural beam, ground support tower or off a tall A-frame truss tower. Since the enclosures rig together and hang from a single point, they are more convenient to assemble and cable than other methods of arraying loudspeakers. The lower portion of the line array is generally curved backwards to increase dispersion at the bottom of the array and allow sound to reach more audience members. Typically, cabinets used in line arrays are trapezoidal, connected by specialized rigging hardware.

== History ==
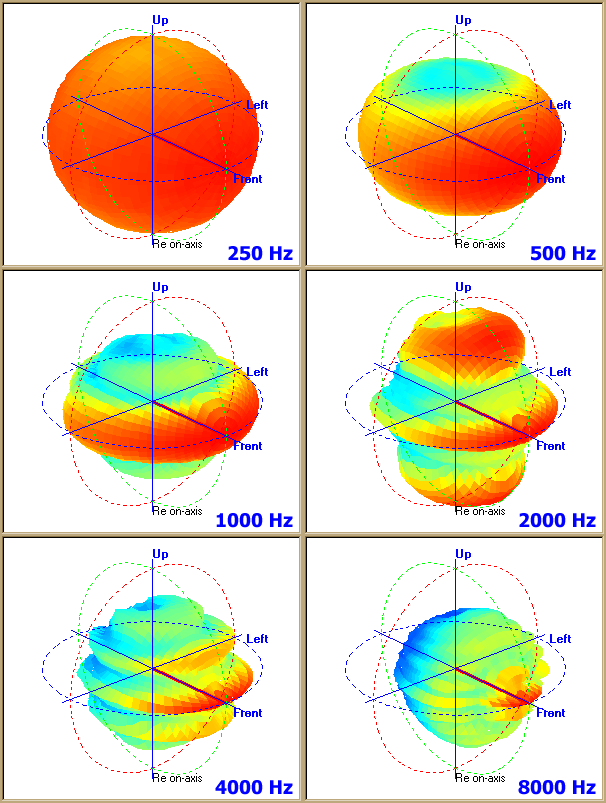
Four-driver column loudspeaker polar patterns, taken at six frequencies

The line array effect of the narrowing of the beam with increasing frequency was first demonstrated by acoustical pioneer Harry Olson. He published his findings in his 1957 text, Acoustical Engineering. Olson used line array concepts to develop the column speaker in which vertically aligned drivers in a single enclosure produced mid-range output in a wide horizontal and narrow vertical pattern. Line arrays have been around for over half a century but until recently most were voice range only. The application for these was for highly reverberant spaces where a narrow vertical design kept from exciting the reverberant field. A multi-band line array elements in a horizontally oriented enclosure was suggested by Joseph D'Appolito in 1983. However, the product was popularized majorly by L-Acoustics' V-DOSC line array introduced in 1992. This led to the discovery that a more level and smoother frequency response can come from fewer boxes in a line array. The industry also soon found that there was no destructive interference in the horizontal plane and waves combine mostly in phase in the vertical plane, causing many loudspeaker manufacturers to quickly develop their own similar product.

=== Grateful Dead's Wall of Sound ===
The Grateful Dead's Wall of Sound, used on tour in 1974, is recognized as the earliest large-scale implementation of line array principles in concert sound reinforcement, even though the term "line array" did not yet exist.

Designed primarily by Owsley "Bear" Stanley with input from Dan Healy and Alembic engineers, and drawing on principles from Harry Olson's 1957 book Acoustical Engineering, the system featured tall, vertically stacked speaker columns ground-stacked behind the band. It used multiple dedicated vertical arrays for vocals, guitars, piano, drums, and bass (with quadraphonic separation), which minimized intermodulation distortion and delivered clearer, more even coverage over large audiences than typical clustered systems of the era.

A 2023 Mix magazine article described it as "a colossal system that was something of a precursor to the modern line array." Although logistically massive, its vertical array approach influenced later concert audio design.

== Theory ==
Pure line array theory is based on pure geometry and the thought experiment of the "free field" where sound is free to propagate free of environmental factors such as room reflections or temperature refraction.

In the free field, sound which has its origin at a point (a point source) will be propagated equally in all directions as a sphere. Since the surface area of a sphere = 4π r^{2} where r is the radius, every doubling of the radius results in a four-fold increase in the sphere's surface area. The result of this is that the sound intensity quarters for every doubling of distance from the point source. Sound intensity is the acoustic power per unit area, and it decreases as the surface area increases since the acoustic power is spread over a greater area. The ratio between two acoustic pressures in deciBels is expressed by the equation dB = 20log(p1/p2), so for every doubling of distance from the point source p1 = 1 and p2 = 2, thus there is a sound pressure decrease of approximately 6 dB.

A line source is a hypothetical one-dimensional source of a sound, as opposed to a dimensionless point source. As a line source propagates sound equally in all directions in the free field, the sound propagates in the shape of a cylinder rather than a sphere. Since the surface area of the curved surface of a cylinder = 2π r h, where r is the radius and h is the height, every doubling of the radius results in a doubling of the surface area, thus the sound intensity halves with each doubling of distance from the line source. Since p1 = 1 and p2 = 4 for every distance doubled, this results in a sound pressure decrease of approximately 3 dB.

In reality, dimensionless point sources and one-dimensional line sources cannot exist; however, calculations can be made based on these theoretical models for simplicity. Thus there is only a certain distance where a line source of a finite length will produce a sound pressure higher than an equally loud point source.

Interference pattern is the term applied to the dispersion pattern of a line array. It means that when you stack several loudspeakers vertically, the vertical dispersion angle decreases because the individual drivers are out of phase with each other at listening positions off-axis in the vertical plane. The taller the stack is, the narrower the vertical dispersion will be and the higher the sensitivity will be on-axis. A vertical array of drivers will have the same horizontal polar pattern as a single driver.

Other than the narrowing vertical coverage, the length of the array also plays a role in what wavelengths will be affected by this narrowing of dispersion. The longer the array, the lower frequency the pattern will control. At frequencies below 100 Hz (wavelength of 11.3 feet (3.4 m)) the line array which is less than approximately 3 meter long will start to become omnidirectional, so the system will not conform to line array theory across all frequencies. Above about 400 Hz the driver cones themselves become directional, again violating the theory's assumptions, and at high frequencies, many practical systems use directional waveguides whose behavior cannot be described using classical line array theory. In short, the geometry of real-world audio line arrays as used in public address systems can only be modeled approximately by line array theory, and only in the 100–400 Hz range.

== High frequencies ==
Practical line array systems act as line sources only in the low- and mid-frequencies. For the high frequencies, some other method must be employed to attain directional characteristics that match those of the lows and mids. The most practical method for reinforcement systems is to use waveguides (horns) coupled to compression drivers. Each horn must have a very narrow vertical and a very wide horizontal dispersion.

Rather than using constructive and destructive interference, horns achieve directionality by reflecting sound into a specified coverage pattern. In a properly designed line array system, that pattern should closely match the low-frequency directional characteristic of the array. If the array's vertical dispersion is 60 degrees and there are 12 boxes, then each horn would need to have 5 degree vertical coverage. (Narrow vertical coverage has the benefit that it minimizes multiple arrivals, which would harm intelligibility.) If this is achieved, then the wave guide elements can be integrated into the line array and, with proper equalization and crossovers, the beam from the high frequencies and the constructive interference of the low frequencies can be made to align so that the resulting arrayed system provides consistent coverage.

== Configurations ==
Two configurations that are rarely used are the straight and curved array. The problem with curved arrays is that they are not very well suited to the average venue. While the bottom half will be angled down to provide extra coverage at locations close to the front of the stage, the top half will be angled upwards at the ceiling. Also, the problem with straight line arrays is that the beam is far too narrow at high frequencies. A solution to utilize the best features of both arrays is to use a curvilinear or ‘J’ array. This is made up of a straight line portion and a curved portion, normally at the bottom. This provides a long throw straight line component for people relatively far away, while the curve at the bottom acts as an in-fill for the area underneath the array that would otherwise be neglected

Spiral arrays are the next development from J-arrays, and have a superior frequency response due to their similar polar pattern at shifting frequencies, while still retaining the long throw and in-fill benefits that J-arrays provide. The concept is that spiral arrays are curved all the way along the array, but the curve is progressive. This means that the top of the array is almost straight with angles of 1° between boxes, and increases at the bottom to between 6° and about 10°. A well-designed spiral array could have an almost constant directivity pattern with frequency, with some small lobes exhibited at low frequencies.

== Design and rigging ==
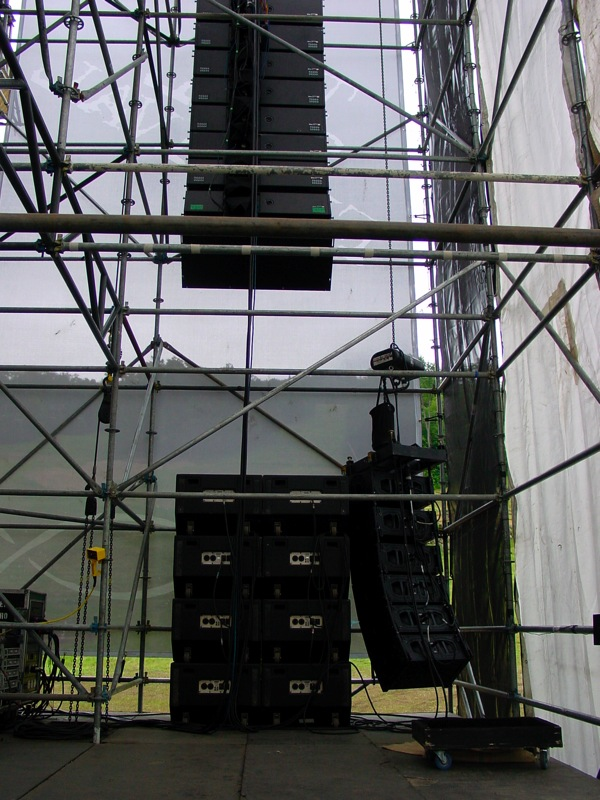
Two different line arrays rigged near a cluster of subwoofers

Large-format line arrays are designed for arena and amphitheatre tours, large venues and outdoor festivals. These boxes typically included multiple vertically aligned high-frequency compression drivers and multiple midranges and low drivers arranged symmetrically around the compression driver. The low-frequency driver is typically 15 or 18 inches in diameter. Mid-format line arrays are typically two or three-way and use 10 or 12 inch low-frequency drivers. The horizontal coverage is typically 90 degrees wide but some systems employ narrower boxes at the top or wider boxes at the bottom of the array. Using a transition frame (which aligns the rigging on dissimilar systems), system engineers may sometimes hang a mid-format box below a large-format box to cover the closest audience members. Speaker boxes from different manufacturers are not mixed because each system has a particular 'voicing' which may be common to a single manufacturer.

Manufacturers typically provide a spreadsheet or custom program to design arrays. Examples include L-Acoustics SOUNDVISION, Adamson Blueprint, Electro-Voice LAPS (Line Array Prediction Software), d&b audiotechnik ArrayCalc, and JBL Vertec Line Array Calculator. Renkus Heinz offers a program called EaseFocus. It is similar to EASE but has only features and calculations specific to Line arrays. EaseFocus has data for a large number of manufacturers allowing comparison of several loudspeaker systems. Other line array brands that use EaseFocus include Bose Professional, Community Professional Loudspeakers, Electro-Voice, QSC, RCF, and VUE Audiotechnik. Meyer Sound offers a different solution by providing an online system called MAPP Online Pro. Nexo offers their 3D modelling software, NS1. EAW offers their own software also, called Resolution.

The design process starts by entering the dimensions of the room and the required sound pressure level. The program then suggests the number and arrangement of boxes. Alternatively, some programs require the number of boxes entered and it will predict the resulting sound pressure levels in different parts of the room.

Once designed, the rigging points are hung from the structure, followed by chain motors (or blocks), flying frame and then the speakers. The individual boxes may be connected one at a time or rigged together on the ground and then pulled up. As the array is lifted, individual box angles are adjusted to match the array prediction program. The top frame may have an inclinometer to confirm the angle of the frame or laser attached which indicates the upper aiming point of the array.

If height or lack of rigging points does not permit flying the speakers, the speakers are typically stacked on the stage or on subwoofers using a custom stacking frame. Stacking of line arrays is common in smaller venues and in temporary installations. Compared to flown speakers, they require less vertical dispersion to cover front to back and the resulting array will have little curvature.
