= Discone antenna =

Type of radio antenna

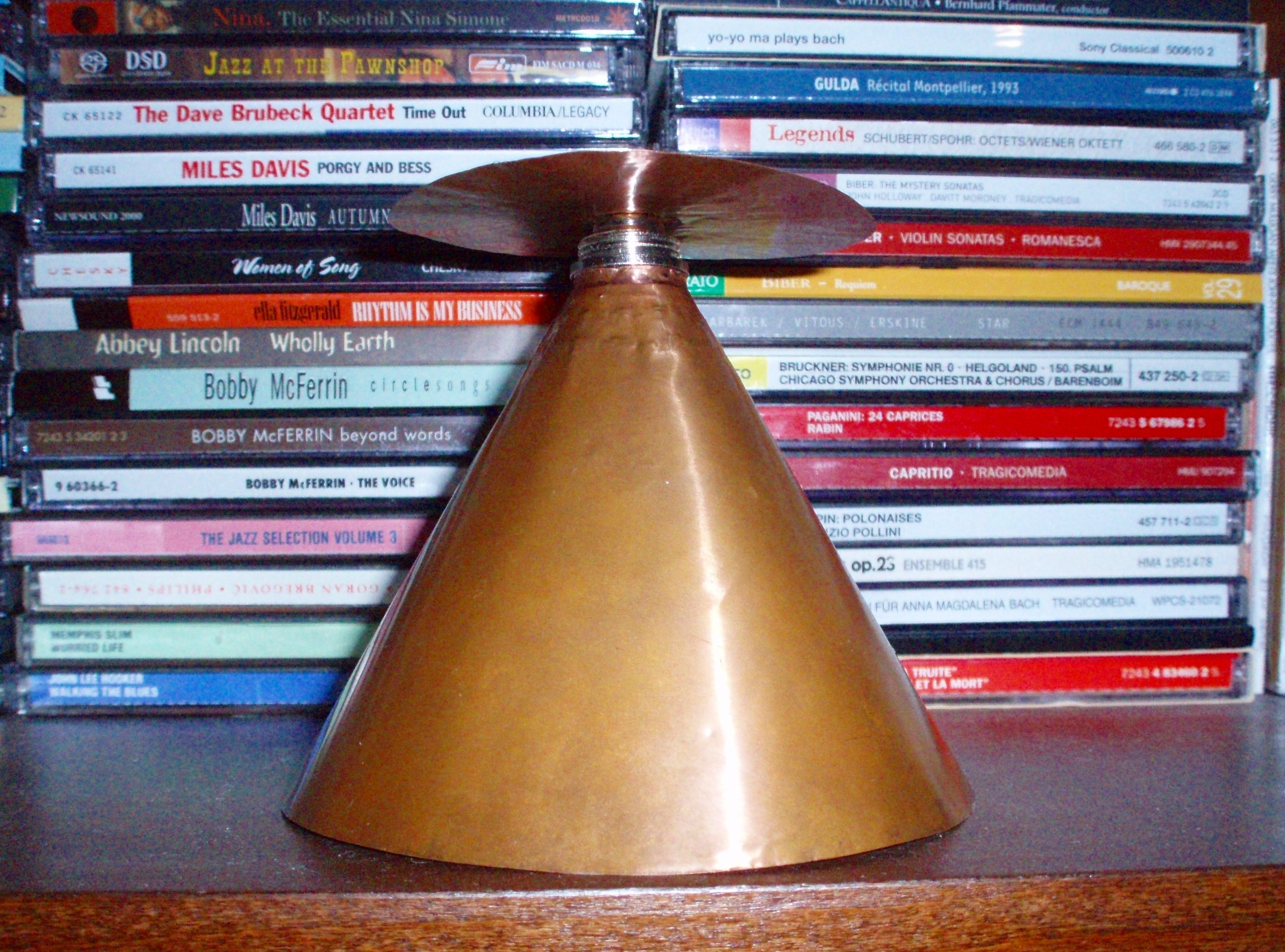
Discone made of solid copper sheets, theoretically covering 700 MHz to 2 GHz.

A discone antenna is a monopole version of a biconical antenna, in which one of the cones is replaced by a disc. It is usually mounted vertically, with the disc at the top and the cone beneath.

Omnidirectional, vertically polarized and with gain similar to a dipole, it is exceptionally wideband, offering a frequency range ratio of up to approximately 10:1. The radiation pattern in the vertical plane is quite narrow, making its sensitivity highest in the direction of the horizon and rather less for signals coming from relatively close by.

== History ==
On February 6, 1945, Armig G. Kandoian of New York City was awarded U.S. patent number US 2368663 "Broad band antenna" (assignor to Federal Telephone and Radio Corporation, later merged with ITT Corporation), from an application made on May 15, 1943.

Excerpt from the Kandoian patent:

In keeping with progress made during the last few years in the development of ultra-high frequency radio technique, and applications thereof to aircraft communication, direction finding, and so forth, it has become necessary to develop special antennas and antenna systems suitable for installation on such aircraft. Flying conditions are such that these antennas must necessarily be small and rigid in their construction and also offer a minimum of wind resistance, in order that the flying efficiency of the aircraft will be unimpaired. In accordance with my invention I have provided a small rigid antenna suitable for mounting on the surface of the fuselage or other component of the airplane structure and in certain embodiments I have also provided a streamlined protecting shield or housing covering or so cooperating with the construction of the antenna system as to greatly reduce wind resistance.

== Description ==
Drawing of dimensions

The discone antenna has a useful frequency range of at least 10 to 1. When employed as a transmitting antenna, a properly constructed discone is just as efficient as an antenna designed for a more limited frequency range. The extra bandwidth comes from the controlled taper and large termination radius of the cone. The cone shape and flat disk disperse the local electric field. This reduces stored energy in the electric field, reducing antenna Q while also reducing losses. The elevation pattern might be distorted with grating lobes. SWR (standing wave ratio) is typically 1.5:1 or less over several octaves of frequency. A discone antenna consists of three main parts: the disc, the cone, and the insulator.

- The disc: The disc should have an overall diameter of 0.7 times a quarter wavelength of the antenna's lowest frequency. The antenna's feed point is at the center of the disc. It is usually fed with 50-ohm coaxial cable, with the center conductor connected to the disc, and the outer conductor to the cone.
- The cone: The length of the cone should be a quarter wavelength of the antenna's lowest operating frequency. The cone angle is generally from 25 to 40 degrees.
- The insulator: The disc and cone must be separated by an insulator, the dimensions of which determine some of the antenna's properties, especially on near its high frequency limit.

== Construction materials ==
A discone may be made from solid metal sheet (often copper), which is practical for small indoor UHF antennas, such as for Wi-Fi.

At lower frequencies a sufficient number of metal wires or rods in a spoke configuration is often used to approximate a solid surface. This simplifies construction and reduces wind loading.

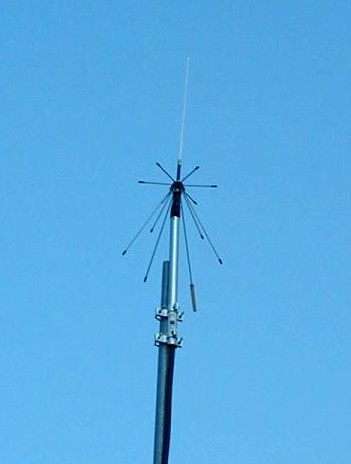
Mounted discone antenna designed for VHF and UHF coverage

The spokes may be made of stiff wire, brazing rods or even coat hanger wire.

The minimum number of rods comprising the disc and cone is often quoted as being from 8 to 16.

== Applications ==
The discone's wideband coverage makes it attractive in commercial, military, amateur radio and radio scanner applications.

The discone's inherently wideband nature permits it to broadcast undesirable spurious emissions from faulty or improperly filtered transmitters.

== Extending low-frequency response ==
A vertical whip may be affixed to the center of the disc in order to extend the low frequency response, but this compromises efficiency at lower frequencies. Rather than be a true discone the functional mode changes to that of an asymmetrical vertical dipole with a thin upper element. In this configuration, at lower frequencies with a vertical element mounted above the disc, the antenna behaves like a sloped radial ground plane antenna.

== See also ==
- Antenna types
- Very high frequency
