= Free field (acoustics) =

Situation with no sound reflections

In acoustics, a free field is a situation or space in which no sound reflections occur.

== Characteristics ==
The lack of reflections in a free field means that any sound in the field is entirely determined by a listener or microphone because it is received through the direct sound of the sound source. This makes the open field a direct sound field. In a free field, sound is attenuated with increased distance according to the inverse-square law.

== Examples and uses ==
In nature, free field conditions occur only when sound reflections from the floor can be ignored, e.g. in new snow in a field, or approximately at good sound-absorbing floors (deciduous, dry sand, etc.) Free field conditions can be artificially produced in anechoic chambers. In particular, free field conditions play a major role in acoustic measurements and sound perception experiments as results are isolated from room reflections.

With voice and sound recordings, one often seeks a condition free from sound reflections similar to a free field, even when during post-processing specifically desired spatial impression will be added, because this is not distorted by any sound reflections of the recording room.

In the simple example shown in Figure 1, a singular sound source emits sound evenly and spherically with no obstructions.

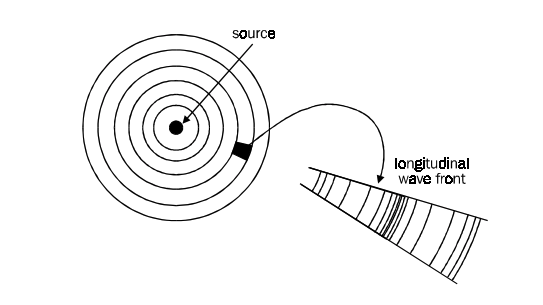
Figure 1.

== Equations ==
The sound intensity and pressure level of any point in a free field is calculated below, where r (in meters) is the distance from the source and "where ρ and c are the air density and speed of sound respectively.

$p^2=\rho c I= \rho cW/4\pi r^2$

To calculate for air pressure, the equation can be written differently:

$L_p=L_w + 10\log_{10} (\rho c/ 400) - 10\log_{10} ( 4 \pi r ^2 )$

In order to simplify this equation we can remove elements:

$L_p=L_w - 10\log_{10} ( 4 \pi r ^2 )$

Measuring the sound pressure level at a reference distance (Rm) from the source allows us measure another distance (r) more easily than other methods:

${\displaystyle L_{p}=L_{m}-20\log _{10}(r/ r_m)}$

This means that as the distance from the sources doubles, the noise level decreases by 6 dB for each doubling. However if the sound field is not truly free of reflections, a directivity factor Q will help "characterise the directional sound radiation properties of a source."

== See also ==
- Line array § Theory
