= Electromagnetic reverberation chamber =

Equipment for electromagnetic testing

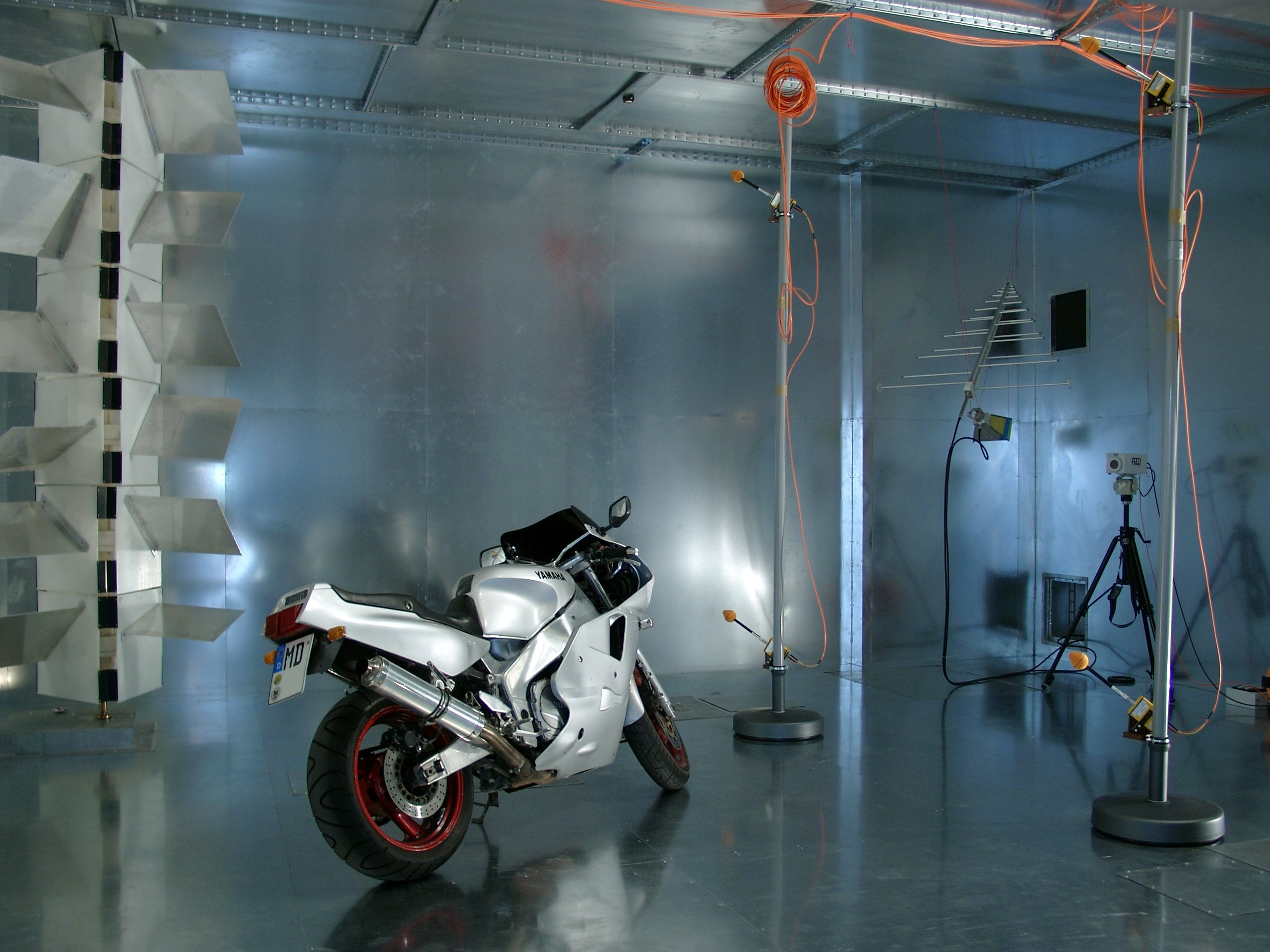
A look inside the (large) Reverberation Chamber at the Otto-von-Guericke-University Magdeburg, Germany. On the left side is the vertical Mode Stirrer (or Tuner), that changes the electromagnetic boundaries to ensure a (statistically) homogeneous field distribution.

An electromagnetic reverberation chamber (also known as a reverb chamber (RVC) or mode-stirred chamber (MSC)) is an environment for electromagnetic compatibility (EMC) testing and other electromagnetic investigations. Electromagnetic reverberation chambers have been introduced first by H.A. Mendes in 1968. A reverberation chamber is screened room with a minimum of absorption of electromagnetic energy. Due to the low absorption, very high field strength can be achieved with moderate input power. A reverberation chamber is a cavity resonator with a high Q factor. Thus, the spatial distribution of the electrical and magnetic field strengths is strongly inhomogeneous (standing waves). To reduce this inhomogeneity, one or more tuners (stirrers) are used. A tuner is a construction with large metallic reflectors that can be moved to different orientations in order to achieve different boundary conditions. The Lowest Usable Frequency (LUF) of a reverberation chamber depends on the size of the chamber and the design of the tuner. Small chambers have a higher LUF than large chambers.

The concept of a reverberation chamber is comparable to a microwave oven.

== Glossary/notation ==
=== Preface ===
The notation is mainly the same as in the IEC standard 61000-4-21. For statistic quantities like mean and maximal values, a more explicit notation is used in order to emphasize the used domain. Here, spatial domain (subscript $s$) means that quantities are taken for different chamber positions, and ensemble domain (subscript $e$) refers to different boundary or excitation conditions (e.g. tuner positions).

=== General ===
- $\vec{E}$: Vector of the electric field.
- $\vec{H}$: Vector of the magnetic field.
- $E_T,\, H_T$: The total electrical or magnetical field strength, i.e. the magnitude of the field vector.
- $E_R,\, H_R$: Field strength (magnitude) of one rectangular component of the electrical or magnetical field vector.
- $Z_0=\frac{|\vec{E}|}{|\vec{H}|} \approx 120\cdot \pi\, \Omega$: Characteristic impedance of the free space
- $\eta_{\rm Tx}$: Efficiency of the transmitting antenna
- $\eta_{\rm Rx}$: Efficiency of the receiving antenna
- $P_{\rm fwd}, \, P_{\rm bwd}$: Power of the forward and backward running waves.
- $Q$: The quality factor.

=== Statistics ===
- ${}_s\langle X \rangle_N$: spatial mean of $X$ for $N$ objects (positions in space).
- ${}_e\langle X \rangle_N$: ensemble mean of $X$ for $N$ objects (boundaries, i.e. tuner positions).
- $\langle X \rangle$: equivalent to $\langle X \rangle_\infty$. This is the expected value in statistics.
- ${}_s\lceil X \rceil_N$: spatial maximum of $X$ for $N$ objects (positions in space).
- ${}_e\lceil X \rceil_N$: ensemble maximum of $X$ for $N$ objects (boundaries, i.e. tuner positions).
- $\lceil X \rceil$: equivalent to $\lceil X \rceil_\infty$.
- ${}_s\!\dagger\!(X)_N$: max to mean ratio in the spatial domain.
- ${}_e\!\dagger\!(X)_N$: max to mean ratio in the ensemble domain.

== Theory ==
=== Cavity resonator ===
A reverberation chamber is cavity resonator—usually a screened room—that is operated in the overmoded region. To understand what that means we have to investigate cavity resonators briefly.

For rectangular cavities, the resonance frequencies (or eigenfrequencies, or natural frequencies) $f_{mnp}$ are given by

$f_{mnp} = \frac{c}{2}\sqrt{\left(\frac{m}{l}\right)^2+\left(\frac{n}{w}\right)^2+\left(\frac{p}{h}\right)^2},$

where $c$ is the speed of light, $l$, $w$ and $h$ are the cavity's length, width and height, and $m$, $n$, $p$ are non-negative integers (at most one of those can be zero).

With that equation, the number of modes with an eigenfrequency less than a given limit $f$, $N(f)$, can be counted. This results in a stepwise function. In principle, two modes—a transversal electric mode $TE_{mnp}$ and a transversal magnetic mode $TM_{mnp}$—exist for each eigenfrequency.

The fields at the chamber position $(x,y,z)$ are given by

- for the TM modes ($H_z=0$)

 
  
    
      
        
          E
          
            x
          
        
        =
        −
        
          
            1
            
              j
              ω
              ϵ
            
          
        
        
          k
          
            x
          
        
        
          k
          
            z
          
        
        cos
        ⁡
        
          k
          
            x
          
        
        x
        sin
        ⁡
        
          k
          
            y
          
        
        y
        sin
        ⁡
        
          k
          
            z
          
        
        z
      
    
    {\displaystyle E_{x}=-{\frac {1}{j\omega \epsilon }}k_{x}k_{z}\cos k_{x}x\sin k_{y}y\sin k_{z}z}
  

 
  
    
      
        
          E
          
            y
          
        
        =
        −
        
          
            1
            
              j
              ω
              ϵ
            
          
        
        
          k
          
            y
          
        
        
          k
          
            z
          
        
        sin
        ⁡
        
          k
          
            x
          
        
        x
        cos
        ⁡
        
          k
          
            y
          
        
        y
        sin
        ⁡
        
          k
          
            z
          
        
        z
      
    
    {\displaystyle E_{y}=-{\frac {1}{j\omega \epsilon }}k_{y}k_{z}\sin k_{x}x\cos k_{y}y\sin k_{z}z}
  

 
  
    
      
        
          E
          
            z
          
        
        =
        
          
            1
            
              j
              ω
              ϵ
            
          
        
        
          k
          
            x
            y
          
          
            2
          
        
        sin
        ⁡
        
          k
          
            x
          
        
        x
        sin
        ⁡
        
          k
          
            y
          
        
        y
        cos
        ⁡
        
          k
          
            z
          
        
        z
      
    
    {\displaystyle E_{z}={\frac {1}{j\omega \epsilon }}k_{xy}^{2}\sin k_{x}x\sin k_{y}y\cos k_{z}z}
  

 
  
    
      
        
          H
          
            x
          
        
        =
        
          k
          
            y
          
        
        sin
        ⁡
        
          k
          
            x
          
        
        x
        cos
        ⁡
        
          k
          
            y
          
        
        y
        cos
        ⁡
        
          k
          
            z
          
        
        z
      
    
    {\displaystyle H_{x}=k_{y}\sin k_{x}x\cos k_{y}y\cos k_{z}z}
  

 
  
    
      
        
          H
          
            y
          
        
        =
        −
        
          k
          
            x
          
        
        cos
        ⁡
        
          k
          
            x
          
        
        x
        sin
        ⁡
        
          k
          
            y
          
        
        y
        cos
        ⁡
        
          k
          
            z
          
        
        z
      
    
    {\displaystyle H_{y}=-k_{x}\cos k_{x}x\sin k_{y}y\cos k_{z}z}
  

 
  
    
      
        
          k
          
            r
          
          
            2
          
        
        =
        
          k
          
            x
          
          
            2
          
        
        +
        
          k
          
            y
          
          
            2
          
        
        +
        
          k
          
            z
          
          
            2
          
        
        ,
        
        
          k
          
            x
          
        
        =
        
          
            
              m
              π
            
            l
          
        
        ,
        
        
          k
          
            y
          
        
        =
        
          
            
              n
              π
            
            w
          
        
        ,
        
        
          k
          
            z
          
        
        =
        
          
            
              p
              π
            
            h
          
        
        
        
          k
          
            x
            y
          
          
            2
          
        
        =
        
          k
          
            x
          
          
            2
          
        
        +
        
          k
          
            y
          
          
            2
          
        
      
    
    {\displaystyle k_{r}^{2}=k_{x}^{2}+k_{y}^{2}+k_{z}^{2},\,k_{x}={\frac {m\pi }{l}},\,k_{y}={\frac {n\pi }{w}},\,k_{z}={\frac {p\pi }{h}}\,k_{xy}^{2}=k_{x}^{2}+k_{y}^{2}}
  

- for the TE modes ($E_z=0$)

 
  
    
      
        
          E
          
            x
          
        
        =
        
          k
          
            y
          
        
        cos
        ⁡
        
          k
          
            x
          
        
        x
        sin
        ⁡
        
          k
          
            y
          
        
        y
        sin
        ⁡
        
          k
          
            z
          
        
        z
      
    
    {\displaystyle E_{x}=k_{y}\cos k_{x}x\sin k_{y}y\sin k_{z}z}
  

 
  
    
      
        
          E
          
            y
          
        
        =
        −
        
          k
          
            x
          
        
        sin
        ⁡
        
          k
          
            x
          
        
        x
        cos
        ⁡
        
          k
          
            y
          
        
        y
        sin
        ⁡
        
          k
          
            z
          
        
        z
      
    
    {\displaystyle E_{y}=-k_{x}\sin k_{x}x\cos k_{y}y\sin k_{z}z}
  

 
  
    
      
        
          H
          
            x
          
        
        =
        −
        
          
            1
            
              j
              ω
              μ
            
          
        
        
          k
          
            x
          
        
        
          k
          
            z
          
        
        sin
        ⁡
        
          k
          
            x
          
        
        x
        cos
        ⁡
        
          k
          
            y
          
        
        y
        cos
        ⁡
        
          k
          
            z
          
        
        z
      
    
    {\displaystyle H_{x}=-{\frac {1}{j\omega \mu }}k_{x}k_{z}\sin k_{x}x\cos k_{y}y\cos k_{z}z}
  

 
  
    
      
        
          H
          
            y
          
        
        =
        −
        
          
            1
            
              j
              ω
              μ
            
          
        
        
          k
          
            y
          
        
        
          k
          
            z
          
        
        cos
        ⁡
        
          k
          
            x
          
        
        x
        sin
        ⁡
        
          k
          
            y
          
        
        y
        cos
        ⁡
        
          k
          
            z
          
        
        z
      
    
    {\displaystyle H_{y}=-{\frac {1}{j\omega \mu }}k_{y}k_{z}\cos k_{x}x\sin k_{y}y\cos k_{z}z}
  

 
  
    
      
        
          H
          
            z
          
        
        =
        
          
            1
            
              j
              ω
              μ
            
          
        
        
          k
          
            x
            y
          
          
            2
          
        
        cos
        ⁡
        
          k
          
            x
          
        
        x
        cos
        ⁡
        
          k
          
            y
          
        
        y
        sin
        ⁡
        
          k
          
            z
          
        
        z
      
    
    {\displaystyle H_{z}={\frac {1}{j\omega \mu }}k_{xy}^{2}\cos k_{x}x\cos k_{y}y\sin k_{z}z}
  

Due to the boundary conditions for the E- and H field, some modes do not exist. The restrictions are:

- For TM modes: m and n can not be zero, p can be zero
- For TE modes: m or n can be zero (but not both can be zero), p can not be zero

A smooth approximation of $N(f)$, $\overline{N}(f)$, is given by

$\overline{N}(f) = \frac{8\pi}{3}lwh\left(\frac{f}{c}\right)^3 - (l+w+h)\frac{f}{c} +\frac{1}{2}.$

The leading term is proportional to the chamber volume and to the third power of the frequency. This term is identical to Weyl's formula.

Comparison of the exact and the smoothed number of modes for the Large Magdeburg Reverberation Chamber.

Based on $\overline{N}(f)$ the mode density $\overline{n}(f)$ is given by

$\overline{n}(f)=\frac{d\overline{N}(f)}{df} = \frac{8\pi}{c}lwh\left(\frac{f}{c}\right)^2 - (l+w+h)\frac{1}{c}.$

An important quantity is the number of modes in a certain frequency interval $\Delta f$, $\overline{N}_{\Delta f}(f)$, that is given by

$$\begin{matrix}
\overline{N}_{\Delta f}(f) & = & \int_{f-\Delta f/2}^{f+\Delta f/2} \overline{n}(f) df \\
\ & = & \overline{N}(f+\Delta f/2) - \overline{N}(f-\Delta f/2)\\
\ & \simeq & \frac{8\pi lwh}{c^3} \cdot f^2 \cdot  \Delta f
\end{matrix}$$

=== Quality factor ===
The Quality Factor (or Q Factor) is an important quantity for all resonant systems. Generally, the Q factor is defined by $Q=\omega\frac{\rm maximum\; stored\; energy}{\rm average\; power\; loss} = \omega \frac{W_s}{P_l},$ where the maximum and the average are taken over one cycle, and $\omega=2\pi f$ is the angular frequency.

The factor Q of the TE and TM modes can be calculated from the fields. The stored energy $W_s$ is given by

$W_s = \frac{\epsilon}{2}\iiint_V |\vec{E}|^2 dV = \frac{\mu}{2}\iiint_V |\vec{H}|^2 dV.$

The loss occurs in the metallic walls. If the wall's electrical conductivity is $\sigma$ and its permeability is $\mu$, the surface resistance $R_s$ is

$R_s = \frac{1}{\sigma\delta_s} = \sqrt{\frac{\pi\mu f}{\sigma}},$

where $\delta_s=1/\sqrt{\pi\mu\sigma f}$ is the skin depth of the wall material.

The losses $P_l$ are calculated according to

$P_l = \frac{R_s}{2}\iint_S |\vec{H}|^2 dS.$

For a rectangular cavity follows

- for TE modes:

 
  
    
      
        
          Q
          
            
              T
              
                E
                
                  m
                  n
                  p
                
              
            
          
        
        =
        
          
            
              
                Z
                
                  0
                
              
              l
              w
              h
            
            
              4
              
                R
                
                  s
                
              
            
          
        
        
          
            
              
                k
                
                  x
                  y
                
                
                  2
                
              
              
                k
                
                  r
                
                
                  3
                
              
            
            
              ζ
              l
              h
              
                (
                
                  
                    k
                    
                      x
                      y
                    
                    
                      4
                    
                  
                  +
                  
                    k
                    
                      x
                    
                    
                      2
                    
                  
                  
                    k
                    
                      z
                    
                    
                      2
                    
                  
                
                )
              
              +
              ξ
              w
              h
              
                (
                
                  
                    k
                    
                      x
                      y
                    
                    
                      4
                    
                  
                  +
                  
                    k
                    
                      y
                    
                    
                      2
                    
                  
                  
                    k
                    
                      z
                    
                    
                      2
                    
                  
                
                )
              
              +
              l
              w
              
                k
                
                  x
                  y
                
                
                  2
                
              
              
                k
                
                  z
                
                
                  2
                
              
            
          
        
      
    
    {\displaystyle Q_{\rm {TE_{mnp}}}={\frac {Z_{0}lwh}{4R_{s}}}{\frac {k_{xy}^{2}k_{r}^{3}}{\zeta lh\left(k_{xy}^{4}+k_{x}^{2}k_{z}^{2}\right)+\xi wh\left(k_{xy}^{4}+k_{y}^{2}k_{z}^{2}\right)+lwk_{xy}^{2}k_{z}^{2}}}}
  


  
    
      
        ζ
        =
        
          
            {
            
              
                
                  1
                
                
                  
                    
                      if 
                    
                  
                  n
                  ≠
                  0
                
              
              
                
                  1
                  
                    /
                  
                  2
                
                
                  
                    
                      if 
                    
                  
                  n
                  =
                  0
                
              
            
            
          
        
        ,
        
        ξ
        =
        
          
            {
            
              
                
                  1
                
                
                  
                    
                      if 
                    
                  
                  m
                  ≠
                  0
                
              
              
                
                  1
                  
                    /
                  
                  2
                
                
                  
                    
                      if 
                    
                  
                  m
                  =
                  0
                
              
            
            
          
        
      
    
    {\displaystyle \zeta ={\begin{cases}1&{\mbox{if }}n\neq 0\\1/2&{\mbox{if }}n=0\end{cases}},\quad \xi ={\begin{cases}1&{\mbox{if }}m\neq 0\\1/2&{\mbox{if }}m=0\end{cases}}}
  

- for TM modes:

  
    
      
        
          Q
          
            
              T
              
                M
                
                  m
                  n
                  p
                
              
            
          
        
        =
        
          
            
              
                Z
                
                  0
                
              
              l
              w
              h
            
            
              4
              
                R
                
                  s
                
              
            
          
        
        
          
            
              
                k
                
                  x
                  y
                
                
                  2
                
              
              
                k
                
                  r
                
              
            
            
              w
              (
              γ
              l
              +
              h
              )
              
                k
                
                  x
                
                
                  2
                
              
              +
              l
              (
              γ
              w
              +
              h
              )
              
                k
                
                  y
                
                
                  2
                
              
            
          
        
      
    
    {\displaystyle Q_{\rm {TM_{mnp}}}={\frac {Z_{0}lwh}{4R_{s}}}{\frac {k_{xy}^{2}k_{r}}{w(\gamma l+h)k_{x}^{2}+l(\gamma w+h)k_{y}^{2}}}}
  


  
    
      
        γ
        =
        
          
            {
            
              
                
                  1
                
                
                  
                    
                      if 
                    
                  
                  p
                  ≠
                  0
                
              
              
                
                  1
                  
                    /
                  
                  2
                
                
                  
                    
                      if 
                    
                  
                  p
                  =
                  0
                
              
            
            
          
        
      
    
    {\displaystyle \gamma ={\begin{cases}1&{\mbox{if }}p\neq 0\\1/2&{\mbox{if }}p=0\end{cases}}}
  

Using the Q values of the individual modes, an averaged Composite Quality Factor $\tilde{Q_s}$ can be derived: $\frac{1}{\tilde{Q_s}} = \langle\frac{1}{Q_{mnp}}\rangle_{k\le k_r \le k_r+\Delta k}$ $\tilde{Q_s} = \frac{3}{2} \frac{V}{S\delta_s} \frac{1}{1+\frac{3c}{16f}\left(1/l + 1/w + 1/h \right)}$

$\tilde{Q_s}$ includes only losses due to the finite conductivity of the chamber walls and is therefore an upper limit. Other losses are dielectric losses e.g. in antenna support structures, losses due to wall coatings, and leakage losses. For the lower frequency range the dominant loss is due to the antenna used to couple energy to the room (transmitting antenna, Tx) and to monitor the fields in the chamber (receiving antenna, Rx). This antenna loss $Q_a$ is given by $Q_a = \frac{16\pi^2 V f^3}{c^3 N_{a}},$ where $N_a$ is the number of antenna in the chamber.

The quality factor including all losses is the harmonic sum of the factors for all single loss processes:

$\frac{1}{Q} = \sum_i \frac{1}{Q_i}$

Resulting from the finite quality factor the eigenmodes are broaden in frequency, i.e. a mode can be excited even if the operating frequency does not exactly match the eigenfrequency. Therefore, more eigenmodes are exited for a given frequency at the same time.

The Q-bandwidth ${\rm BW}_Q$ is a measure of the frequency bandwidth over which the modes in a reverberation chamber are correlated. The ${\rm BW}_Q$ of a reverberation chamber can be calculated using the following:

${\rm BW}_Q=\frac{f}{Q}$

Using the formula $\overline{N}_{\Delta f}(f)$ the number of modes excited within ${\rm BW}_Q$ results to

$M(f)=\frac{8\pi V f^3}{c^3 Q}.$

Related to the chamber quality factor is the chamber time constant $\tau$ by

$\tau=\frac{Q}{2\pi f}.$

That is the time constant of the free energy relaxation of the chamber's field (exponential decay) if the input power is switched off.

== See also ==
- Anechoic chamber
- Reverberation room
- Echo chamber
- Integrating sphere
- GTEM cell
