= Reverberation room =

Room designed to create diffuse sound

A reverberation room or reverberation chamber is a room designed to create reverberation, a diffuse or random incidence sound field (i.e., one with a uniform distribution of acoustic energy and random direction of sound incidence over a short time period). Reverberation chambers tend to be large rooms (the resulting sound field becomes more diffused with increased path length) and have very hard exposed surfaces. The change of impedance (compared to the air) these surfaces present to incident sound is so large that virtually all of the acoustic energy that hits a surface is reflected back into the room. Arranging the room surfaces (including the ceiling) to be non-parallel helps inhibit the formation of standing waves - additional acoustic diffusers are often used to create more reflecting surfaces and further encourage even distribution of any particular sound field.

Reverberation chambers are used in acoustics as well as in electrodynamics, such as for measurement microphone calibration, measurement of the sound power of a source, and measurement of the absorption coefficient of a material. All these techniques assume the sound field in the chamber to be diffuse, and will normally use a broadband sound source (e.g. white noise or pink noise) so that the resulting sound field contains acoustic energy across the whole audible range.

== Standards ==
The primary international standard governing sound absorption measurements in reverberation rooms is ISO 354:2003 (Acoustics — Measurement of sound absorption in a reverberation room), which specifies the test method, specimen mounting, and room requirements for determining the random-incidence absorption coefficient of acoustic materials. Sound power measurements in reverberation rooms follow ISO 3741.

== Applications ==
Reverberation rooms are used in several areas of acoustics:

- Sound absorption measurement — Determining the random-incidence sound absorption coefficient of building materials, acoustic panels, ceiling tiles, curtains, and furniture. In the reverberation-room method for measuring sound absorption, the absorption coefficient of a test specimen is determined from the difference between the reverberation times measured in the chamber with and without the specimen present, using the Sabine equation to relate the change in decay time to the added absorption. The procedure, including requirements for chamber volume, diffusivity and specimen size, is standardised in ISO 354.
- Sound power measurement — Measuring the sound power level of noise sources such as machines, fans, and appliances according to ISO 3741 and related standards.
- Transmission loss testing — When coupled with an adjacent anechoic chamber or receiving room, reverberation rooms are used to measure the sound transmission class of walls, doors, and windows.
- Microphone calibration — The diffuse sound field allows calibration of measurement microphones for random-incidence response.

== See also ==
- Anechoic chamber, an acoustic test facility which minimizes reverberation
- Echo chamber, a reverberation room used for music recording
- Electromagnetic reverberation chamber, an electromagnetic environment mainly for electromagnetic compatibility testing
