= Audio power =

Electricity to a loudspeaker for sound

Sound measurements
- Characteristic: Symbols
- Sound pressure: p, SPL, L_{PA}
- Particle velocity: v, SVL
- Particle displacement: δ
- Sound intensity: I, SIL
- Sound power: P, SWL, L_{WA}
- Sound energy: W
- Sound energy density: w
- Sound exposure: E, SEL
- Acoustic impedance: Z
- Audio frequency: AF
- Transmission loss: TL

Audio power is the electrical power transferred from an audio amplifier to a loudspeaker, measured in watts. The electrical power delivered to the loudspeaker, together with the speaker's efficiency, determines the sound power generated (with the rest of the electrical power being converted to heat).

Amplifiers are limited in the electrical power they can output, while loudspeakers are limited in the electrical power they can convert to sound power without being damaged or distorting the audio signal. These limits, or power ratings, are important to consumers in finding compatible products and comparing competitors.

== Power handling ==
In audio electronics, there are several methods of measuring power output, for such things as amplifiers, and power handling capacity, for such things as loudspeakers.

=== Amplifiers ===
Amplifier output power is limited by voltage, current, and temperature:

- Voltage: The amp's power supply voltage limits the maximum amplitude of the waveform it can output. This determines the maximum possible peak output power for a given load resistance.
- Current: The amp's output devices (transistors or tubes) have a current limit based on the internal impedance of the amplifier. Excessive current may also cause damage to the amp or trip protection circuits within the amp. The maximum current determines the minimum load resistance that the amp can drive at its maximum voltage.
- Temperature: The amp's output devices waste some of the electrical energy as heat, and if it is not removed quickly enough, they will rise in temperature to the point of damage. The temperature rise can limit maximum continuous output power.

As an amplifier's power output strongly influences how much consumers are willing to pay for it, there is an incentive for manufacturers to exaggerate output power specs. Without regulations, imaginative approaches to advertising power ratings became so common that in 1975 the US Federal Trade Commission intervened in the market and required all amplifier manufacturers to use an engineering measurement (continuous average power) in addition to any other value they might cite.

=== Loudspeakers ===
For loudspeakers, there is also a thermal and a mechanical aspect to maximum power handling.

- Thermal: Not all energy delivered to a loudspeaker is emitted as sound. In fact, most is converted to heat, and the temperature must not rise too high. High-level signals over a prolonged period can cause thermal damage, which may be immediately obvious or may reduce longevity or performance margin.
- Mechanical: Loudspeaker components have mechanical limits which can be exceeded by even a very brief power peak; an example is the most common sort of loudspeaker driver, which cannot move in or out more than some excursion limit without mechanical damage.

Unlike with amplifiers, there are no similar loudspeaker power handling regulations in the US; the problem is much harder as many loudspeaker systems have very different power handling capacities at different frequencies (e.g., the tweeters in loudspeaker systems handle high-frequency signals, are physically small and easily damaged, while woofers handle low-frequency signals and are larger and more robust).

== Power calculations ==
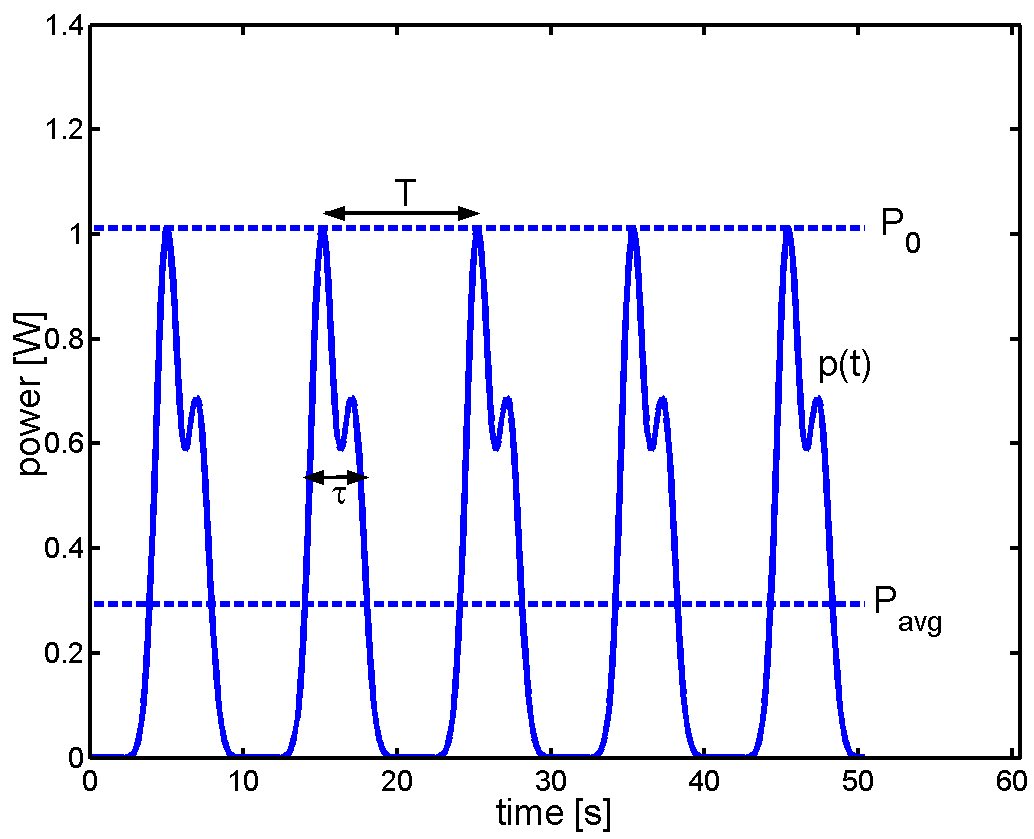
A graph of instantaneous power over time for a waveform, with peak power labeled P_{0} and average power labeled P_{avg}

Since the instantaneous power of an AC waveform varies over time, AC power, which includes audio power, is measured as an average over time. It is based on this formula:

$$P_\mathrm{avg} = \frac{1}{T}\int_{0}^{T} v(t) \cdot i(t)\, dt \,$$

For a purely resistive load, a simpler equation can be used, based on the root mean square (RMS) values of the voltage and current waveforms:

$$P_\mathrm{avg} = V_\mathrm{rms} \cdot I_\mathrm{rms} \,$$

In the case of a steady sinusoidal tone into a purely resistive load, this can be calculated from the peak amplitude of the voltage waveform (which is easier to measure with an oscilloscope) and the load's resistance:

$$P_\mathrm{avg} = \frac{{V_\mathrm{rms}}^2}{R} = \frac{{V_\mathrm{peak}}^2}{2R} \,$$

Though a speaker is not purely resistive and audio program is not a sinusoid, these equations are sometimes used to approximate power measurements for such a system.

=== Example ===
An amplifier under test can drive a sinusoidal signal with a peak amplitude of 6 V (driven by a 12 V battery). When connected to an 8 ohm loudspeaker this would deliver:

$$P_\mathrm{avg} = {(6~\mathrm{V})^2 \over 2(8~\Omega)}\,\ = 2.25~\mathrm{W}$$

In most actual car systems, the amplifiers are connected in a bridge-tied load configuration, and speaker impedances are no higher than 4 Ω. High-power car amplifiers use a DC-to-DC converter to generate a higher supply voltage.

== Measurements ==
=== Continuous power and RMS power ===
A voltage waveform and its corresponding power waveform (assuming a resistive load). RMS voltage in blue, peak power in red, average power in green.

Continuous average sine wave power ratings are a staple of performance specifications for audio amplifiers and, sometimes, loudspeakers.

As described above, the term average power refers to the average value of the instantaneous power waveform over time. As this is typically derived from the root mean square (RMS) of the sine wave voltage, it may be referred to as RMS power or watts RMS. This should not to be interpreted as the RMS value of the power waveform. Watts RMS is used in an ANSI standard where it is also referred to as the nominal value and where there is a product mark requirement to use it.

Continuous (as opposed to peak) implies that the device can function at this power level for long periods of time; that heat can be removed at the same rate it is generated, without temperature building up to the point of damage.

On May 3, 1974, the Federal Trade Commission (FTC) instated its Amplifier Rule to combat the unrealistic power claims made by many hi-fi amplifier manufacturers. This rule prescribes continuous power measurements performed with sine wave signals for advertising and specifications of amplifiers sold in the US. This rule was amended in 1998 to cover self-powered speakers, such as those commonly used with personal computers.

Typically, an amplifier's power specifications are calculated by measuring its RMS output voltage, with a continuous sine wave signal, at the onset of clipping—defined arbitrarily as a stated percentage of total harmonic distortion (THD), usually 1%, into specified load resistances. Typical loads used are 8 and 4 ohms per channel; many amplifiers used in professional audio are also specified at 2 ohms. Considerably more power can be delivered if distortion is allowed to increase; some manufacturers quote maximum power at a higher distortion, like 10%, making their equipment appear more powerful.

The sine wave used for continuous power measurements does not actually describe the highly varied signals found in audio reproduction, but these measurements are widely regarded as a reasonable way of describing an amplifier's maximum output capability.

In loudspeakers, thermal capacities of the voice coils and magnet structures largely determine continuous power handling ratings. However, at the lower end of a loudspeaker's usable frequency range, its power handling might necessarily be derated because of mechanical excursion limits. For example, a subwoofer rated at 100 watts may be able to handle 100 watts of power at 80 hertz, but at 25 hertz it might not be able to handle nearly as much power since such frequencies may force the driver beyond its mechanical limits much before reaching 100 watts from the amplifier.

=== Peak power ===
Peak power refers to the maximum of the instantaneous power waveform, which, for a sine wave, is always twice the average power. For other waveforms, the relationship between peak power and average power is the peak-to-average power ratio (PAPR).

The peak power of an amplifier is determined by the voltage rails and the maximum amount of current its electronic components can handle instantaneously without damage. This characterizes the ability of equipment to handle quickly changing power levels, as many audio signals have a highly dynamic nature.

Peak power is always a higher value than the average power figure, however, and so it has been tempting to use in advertising without context, making it look as though the amp has twice the power of competitors.

=== Total system power ===
Total system power is a term often used in audio electronics to rate the power of an audio system. Total system power refers to the total power consumption of the unit, rather than the power handling of the speakers or the power output of the amplifier. This can be viewed as a somewhat deceptive marketing ploy, as the total power consumption of the unit will, of course, be greater than any of its other power ratings, except for possibly the peak power of the amplifier. Shelf stereos and surround sound receivers are often rated using total system power.

One way to use total system power to get a more accurate estimate of amplifier output power is to consider the amplifier class, from which one could derive an estimate of the power output by considering the efficiency of the class. For example, class AB amplifiers can vary widely from 25% to 75% efficiency while Class D amps are much higher at 80% to 95%.

In some cases, an audio device may be measured by the total system power of all its loudspeakers by adding all their peak power ratings. Many home theater in a box systems are rated this way. Often, low-end home theater systems' power ratings are taken at a high level of harmonic distortion as well; as high as 10%, which would be noticeable.

=== PMPO ===
PMPO, which stands for Peak Music Power Output or Peak momentary performance output, is a much more dubious figure of merit, of interest more to advertising copy-writers than to consumers. The term PMPO has never been defined in any standard. Different manufacturers use different definitions, so that the ratio of PMPO to continuous power output varies widely; it is not possible to convert from one to the other.

== Power and loudness in the real world ==
Perceived loudness varies approximately logarithmically with the acoustical output power. The change in perceived loudness as a function of change in acoustical power is dependent on the reference power level. It is both useful and technically accurate to express perceived loudness in the logarithmic decibel (dB) scale that is independent of the reference power, with a somewhat straight-line relationship between 10 dB changes and doublings of perceived loudness.

The approximately logarithmic relationship between power and perceived loudness is an important factor in audio system design. Both amplifier power and speaker sensitivity affect the maximum realizable loudness. Sensitivity is typically measured either suspended in an anechoic chamber in free space (for full-range speakers), or with the source and receiver outside on the ground in half space (for a subwoofer). When measuring in half space, the boundary of the ground plane cuts the available space that the sound radiates into in half and doubles the acoustical power at the receiver, for a corresponding 3 dB increase in measured sensitivity, so it is important to know the test conditions.

While a doubling or halving of perceived loudness corresponds to approximately 10 dB increase or decrease in speaker sensitivity, it also corresponds to approximately a 10-fold multiplication or division of acoustical power. Even a relatively modest 3 dB increase or decrease in sensitivity corresponds to a doubling or halving of acoustical power. ±3 dB change in measured sensitivity also corresponds to a similar doubling or halving of electrical power required to generate a given perceived loudness, so even deceptively minor differences in sensitivity can result in large changes in amplifier power requirement.

Many high-quality domestic speakers have a sensitivity between ~84 dB and ~94 dB, but professional speakers can have a sensitivity between ~90 dB and ~100 dB. An 84 dB speaker would require a 400-watt amplifier to produce the same acoustical power as a 90 dB speaker being driven by a 100-watt amplifier, or a 100 dB speaker being driven by a 10-watt amplifier. A good measure of the power of a system is therefore a plot of maximum loudness before clipping of the amplifier and loudspeaker combined, in dB SPL, over the audible frequency spectrum, at the intended listening position. The human ear is less sensitive to low frequencies, as indicated by equal-loudness contours, so a well-designed system should be capable of generating relatively higher sound levels below 100 Hz before clipping.

Like perceived loudness, speaker sensitivity also varies with frequency and power. The sensitivity is measured at 1 watt to minimize nonlinear effects such as power compression and harmonic distortion, and averaged over the usable bandwidth. The bandwidth is often specified between the measured +/-3 dB cutoff frequencies where the relative output becomes attenuated from the peak output by at least 6 dB. Some speaker manufacturers use +3 dB/-6 dB instead, to take into account the real-world in-room response of a speaker at frequency extremes where the floor, wall and ceiling boundaries may increase usable output.

Speaker sensitivity is measured and rated on the assumption of a fixed amplifier output voltage because audio amplifiers tend to behave like voltage sources. Sensitivity can be a misleading metric due to differences in speaker impedance between differently designed speakers. A speaker with a higher impedance may have lower measured sensitivity and thus appear to be less efficient than a speaker with a lower impedance even though their efficiencies are actually similar. Speaker efficiency is a metric that only measures the actual percentage of electrical power that the speaker converts to acoustic power and is sometimes a more appropriate metric to use when investigating ways to achieve a given acoustic power from a speaker.

Adding an identical and mutually coupled speaker driver (less than a quarter wavelength away from each other) and splitting the electrical power equally between the two drivers increases their combined efficiency by a maximum of 3 dB, similar to increasing the size of a single driver until the diaphragm area doubles. Multiple drivers can be more practical to increase efficiency than larger drivers since frequency response is generally proportional to driver size.

System designers take advantage of this efficiency boost by using mutually coupled drivers in a speaker cabinet, and by using mutually coupled speaker cabinets in a venue. Each doubling of total driver area in the array of drivers brings ~3 dB increase in efficiency up to a limit where the total distance between any two drivers of the array exceeds a quarter wavelength.

Power handling capability is also doubled when the number of drivers doubles, producing a maximum realizable increase of ~6 dB in total acoustic output per doubling of mutually coupled drivers when the total amplifier power is also doubled. Mutual coupling efficiency gains become difficult to realize with multiple drivers at higher frequencies because the total size of a single driver including its diaphragm, basket, waveguide or horn may already exceed a quarter wavelength.

Sources a quarter wavelength or smaller behave like point sources that radiate omnidirectionally in free space, whereas sources larger than a wavelength beam the sound forward. This beaming tends to make high-frequency dispersion problematic in larger venues, so a designer may have to cover the listening area with multiple sources aimed in various directions or placed in various locations.

Likewise, speaker proximity less than a quarter wavelength to one or more boundaries such as floor, walls, or ceiling can increase the effective sensitivity by changing free space into half space, quarter space, or eighth space. When the distance to boundaries is less than a quarter wavelength, delayed reflections can increase the perceived loudness but can also induce ambient effects such as comb filtering and reverberation that can make the frequency response uneven across a venue or make the sound diffuse and harsh, especially in smaller venues and with hard reflective surfaces. Sound-absorbing structures, sound-diffusing structures, and digital signal processing may be employed to compensate for boundary effects within the designated listening area.

== Matching amplifier to loudspeaker ==
Charles "Chuck" McGregor, while serving as senior technologist for Eastern Acoustic Works, wrote a guideline for professional audio purchasers wishing to select properly sized amplifiers for their loudspeakers. Chuck McGregor recommended a rule of thumb in which the amplifier's maximum power output rating was twice the loudspeaker's continuous (so-called "RMS") rating, give or take 20%. In his example, a loudspeaker with a continuous power rating of 250 watts would be well-matched by an amplifier with a maximum power output within the range of 400 to 625 watts.

JBL, which tests and labels their loudspeakers according to the IEC 268-5 standard (called IEC 60268-5 more recently) has a more nuanced set of recommendations, depending on the usage profile of the system, which more fundamentally involves the (worst case) crest factor of the signal used to drive the loudspeakers:

1. For "carefully monitored applications where peak transient capability must be maintained, a system should be powered with an amplifier capable of delivering twice its IEC rating." As an example, a studio monitor rated at 300 watts IEC, can be safely driven by a 600-watt (RMS) amplifier, provided that "peak signals are normally of such short duration that they hardly stress the system's components".
2. For "routine application where high continuous, but non-distorted, output is likely to be encountered, a system should be powered with an amplifier capable of delivering the IEC rating of the system". This includes most consumer systems. "Such systems can often be inadvertently overdriven, or can go into feedback. When powered with an amplifier equal to their IEC rating, the user is guaranteed of safe operation."
3. "For musical instrument application, where distorted (overdriven) output may be a musical requirement, the system should be powered with an amplifier capable of delivering only one-half of the IEC rating for the system." This necessary because, for example, an amplifier normally outputting "300 watts of undistorted sinewave" can reach closer to 600 watts of power when clipping (i.e. when its output is closer to a square wave). If such a scenario is plausible, then for safe operation of the loudspeaker, the amplifier's (RMS) rating must no more than half the IEC power of the loudspeaker.

== Power handling in 'active' speakers ==
Active speakers comprise two or three speakers per channel, each fitted with its own amplifier, and preceded by an electronic crossover filter to separate the low-level audio signal into the frequency bands to be handled by each speaker. This approach enables complex active filters to be used on the low level signal, without the need to use passive crossovers of high power handling capability but limited rolloff and with large and expensive inductors and capacitors. An additional advantage is that peak power handling is greater if the signal has simultaneous peaks in two different frequency bands. A single amplifier has to handle the peak power when both signal voltages are at their crest; as power is proportional to the square of voltage, the peak power when both signals are at the same peak voltage is proportional to the square of the sum of the voltages. If separate amplifiers are used, each must handle the square of the peak voltage in its own band. For example, if bass and midrange each has a signal corresponding to 10 W of output, a single amplifier capable of handling a 40 W peak would be needed, but a bass and a treble amplifier each capable of handling 10 W would be sufficient. This is relevant when peaks of comparable amplitude occur in different frequency bands, as with wideband percussion and high-amplitude bass notes.

For most audio applications more power is needed at low frequencies. This requires a high-power amplifier for low frequencies (e.g., 200 watts for 20–200 Hz band), lower power amplifier for the midrange (e.g., 50 watts for 200 to 1000 Hz), and even less the high end (e.g. 5 watts for 1000–20000 Hz). Proper design of a bi/tri amplifier system requires a study of driver (speaker) frequency response and sensitivities to determine optimal crossover frequencies and power amplifier powers.

== Regional variations ==
=== United States ===
Peak momentary power output and peak music power output are two different measurements with different specifications and should not be used interchangeably. Manufacturers who use different words such as pulse or performance may be reflecting their own non-standard system of measurement, with an unknown meaning. The Federal Trade Commission is putting an end to this with Federal Trade Commission (FTC) Rule 46 CFR 432 (1974), affecting Power Output Claims for Amplifiers Utilized in Home Entertainment Products.

In response to a Federal Trade Commission order, the Consumer Electronics Association has established a clear and concise measure of audio power for consumer electronics. They have posted an FTC approved product marking template on their web site and the full standard is available for a fee. Many believe this will resolve much of the ambiguity and confusion in amplifier ratings. There will be ratings for speaker and powered speaker system too. This specification only applies to audio amplifiers. An EU counterpart is expected and all equipment sold in the US and Europe will be identically tested and rated.

This regulation did not cover automobile entertainment systems, which consequently still suffer from power ratings confusion. However, a new Approved American National Standard ANSI/CEA-2006-B which includes testing & measurement methods for mobile audio amplifiers is being slowly phased into the market by many manufacturers.

=== Europe ===
DIN (Deutsches Institut für Normung, German Institute for Standardization) describes in DIN 45xxx several standards for measuring audio power. The DIN-standards (DIN-norms) are in common use in Europe.

=== International ===
IEC 60268-2 defines power amplifier specifications including power output.

== See also ==
- Audio system measurements
- Sound level meter
- Audio noise measurement
