= Particle acceleration =

In acoustics, particle acceleration is the acceleration (rate of change in speed and direction) of particles in a sound transmission medium. When sound passes through a medium it causes particle displacement and as such causes changes in their acceleration.

The acceleration of the air particles of a plane sound wave is given by:
$$a = \delta \cdot \omega^2 = v \cdot \omega = \frac{p \cdot \omega}{Z} = \omega \sqrt \frac{J}{Z} = \omega \sqrt \frac{E}{\rho} = \omega \sqrt \frac{P_\text{ac}}{Z \cdot A}$$

Symbol	Units	Meaning
a	m/s^{2}	particle acceleration
v	m/s	particle velocity
δ	m, meters	particle displacement
ω = 2πf	radians/s	angular frequency
f	Hz, hertz	frequency
p	Pa, pascals	sound pressure
Z	N·s/m^{3}	acoustic impedance
J	W/m^{2}	sound intensity
E	W·s/m^{3}	sound energy density
P_{ac}	W, watts	sound power or acoustic power
A	m^{2}	area

== See also ==
- Sound
- Sound particle
- Particle displacement
- Particle velocity
