= Rayl =

Unit of specific acoustic impedance

A rayl (symbol Rayl) is one of two units of specific acoustic impedance and characteristic acoustic impedance; one an MKS unit, and the other a CGS unit. These have the same dimensions as momentum per volume.

The units are named after John William Strutt, 3rd Baron Rayleigh. They are not to be confused with the unit of photon flux, the rayleigh.

== Explanation ==
=== Specific acoustic impedance ===
When sound waves pass through any physical substance the pressure of the waves causes the particles of the substance to move. The sound specific impedance is the ratio between the sound pressure and the particle velocity it produces.

Specific acoustic impedance is defined as:

$${\underline{Z}(\mathbf{r},\omega) = \frac{\underline{p}(\mathbf{r},\omega)}{\underline{v}(\mathbf{r},\omega)}}$$

where $\underline{Z}, \underline{p}$ and $\underline{v}$ are the specific acoustic impedance, pressure and particle velocity phasors, $\mathbf{r}$ is the position and $\omega$ is the frequency.

=== Characteristic acoustic impedance ===
The rayl is also used for the characteristic (acoustic) impedance of a medium, which is an inherent property of a medium:

$${Z_0= \rho_0 c_0}$$

Here, ${Z_0}$ is the characteristic impedance, and ${\rho_0}$ and ${c_0}$ are the density and speed of sound in the unperturbed medium (i.e. when there are no sound waves travelling in it).

In a viscous medium, there will be a phase difference between the pressure and velocity, so the specific acoustic impedance $\underline{Z}$ will be different from the characteristic acoustic impedance ${Z_0}$.

=== MKS and CGS units ===
Subscripts are used in this section to distinguish identically named units. Texts often refer to "the MKS rayl" to ensure clarity.

The MKS unit of specific acoustic impedance is the pascal-second per meter, and is often called the rayl (MKS: 1 Rayl = 1 Pa·s·m^{−1}).

The MKS unit and the CGS unit confusingly have the same name, but are not the same quantity (or unit):

- As an MKS unit, one rayl equals one pascal-second per meter (Pa·s·m^{−1}), or equivalently one newton-second per cubic meter (N·s·m^{−3}). Expressed in SI base units, that is kg·s^{−1}·m^{−2}:
  1 Rayl_{MKS} = 1 N⋅s/m^{3} = 1 Pa⋅s/m = 1 kg/(s⋅m^{2})
- As a CGS unit, one rayl equals one barye-second per centimeter (ba·s·cm^{−1}), or equivalently one dyne-second per cubic centimeter (dyn·s·cm^{−3}). Expressed in CGS base units, that is g·s^{−1}·cm^{−2}:
  1 Rayl_{CGS} = 1 dyn⋅s/cm^{3} = 1 ba⋅s/cm = 1 g/(s⋅cm^{2})
- The CGS unit rayl is ten times larger than the MKS unit rayl:
  1 Rayl_{CGS} = 10 Rayl_{MKS}
