= Healdsburg Transfer Station =

Refuse transfer station in Healdsburg California

Coordinates: 38.6515°N 122.8686°W

The Healdsburg Transfer Station is a solid waste recycling and reuse facility in Sonoma County, California, located at 166 Alexander Valley Road, north of the City of Healdsburg. It is privately owned by Republic Services along with all other former Sonoma County transfer stations as of April 1, 2015. Its coordinates are .

Sonoma County along with some European nations and certain other non-federal U.S. public agencies has been a leader in recycling and adopting an extended producer responsibility plan to promote waste stream recycling and reuse. The Healdsburg Transfer Facility receives and processes a wide array of residential and commercial wastes in order to reduce the waste stream volume destined for landfills.

== Environmental issues ==
The facility has oversight from the Sonoma County Environmental Health Department, which assures adequate protection of water quality and prevention of soil contamination due to the facility's operations. The county has also retained Lumina Technologies to conduct an independent assessment of sound levels emitted from the facility and access vehicles. Results of the sound level testing indicated that the Healdsburg Transfer Facility operates in a manner consistent with state and county noise regulations.

== See also ==
- Recyclable waste
