= Total system power =

Total system power is a term often used in audio electronics to rate the power of an audio system. Total system power refers to the total power consumption of the unit, rather than the power handling of the speakers or the power output of the amplifier. This can be viewed as a somewhat deceptive marketing ploy, as the total power consumption of the unit will of course be greater than any of its other power ratings, except for, perhaps, the peak power of the amplifier, which is essentially an exaggerated value anyway. Shelf stereos and surround sound receivers are often rated using total system power.

One way to use total system power to get a more accurate estimate of power is to consider the amplifier class which would give an educated guess of the power output by considering the efficiency of the class. For example, class AB amplifiers are around 25 or 50% efficiency while Class D amps are much higher; around 80% or more efficiency. A very exceptional efficiency for a specific Class D amp, the ROHM BD5421efs, operates at 90% efficiency.

In some cases, an audio device may be measured by the total system power of all its loudspeakers by adding all their peak power ratings. Many home theater in a box systems are rated this way. Often low-end home theater systems' power ratings are taken at a high level of harmonic distortion as well; as high as 10%, which would be painfully noticeable.
