= Sound particle =

In continuum mechanics, specifically in acoustics, a sound particle refers to a material element in a medium through which an acoustic wave is transmitted.

Here, the term material element is only applicable in the continuum model of matter, where a material body is assumed to consist of uncountably infinitely many points (called material points), which take up all the space within the region of the body. In other words, a material body is assumed to be (the closure of) a regular open, connected bounded subset of either $\mathbb{R}$, $\mathbb{R}^{2}$ or $\mathbb{R}^{3}$, depending on whether the body is a one-dimensional elastic rod, a two-dimensional elastic lamina, or a three-dimensional elastic body, respectively. A material medium is defined in the same way, except that it need not be a bounded subset.

The continuum model of matter ignores that matter is made of finitely small, discrete particles (atoms or molecules); the material points in a continuum body are modelled as points in Euclidean space, and are not to be visualized as finitely small, discrete particles.

== Material elements ==
A material element, or an element of a material medium, is a subset $\Delta S$ of a material medium such that the length of the intersection of all intervals that contain the image of $\Delta S$ under the mass density function (the density function of the mass distribution within the material medium with respect to volume, the density function being continuous and positive at every point in the medium except possibly on a nowhere dense set, and the image of the medium under the mass density function being a bounded set) is negligible compared to the density of the material medium at the centroid of $\Delta S$, and that $\Delta S$ is bounded by an arbitrarily small open ball within the medium, the term arbitrarily small being used to indicate that the radius of the ball is negligible compared to the distance between the centroids of any two distinct material elements under consideration.

The mass $\Delta m$ of $\Delta S$ is approximated to be $\rho\Delta V$, where $\rho$ is the mass density of the medium at the centroid of $\Delta S$, and $\Delta V$ is the volume of $\Delta S$.

Material elements can be considered as either volume elements or mass elements. For volume elements, the volume, $\Delta V$, is assumed to be constant amongst material elements under consideration; whereas for mass elements, the mass $\Delta m$ is assumed to be constant amongst material elements under consideration.

== Sound particles ==
When a longitudinal mechanical wave (acoustic wave) is transmitted through an elastic body, each material element, through which the wave has passed, oscillates about a stable equilibrium point, with the restoring force being the elastic forces exerted by adjacent material elements. For each material element, the radius of the smallest Euclidean ball in which the material element is contained in is negligible compared to the amplitude of the oscillation. These material elements are referred to as sound particles.

== Distinction from kinetic theory of matter ==
The kinetic theory of matter assumes that matter is made of discrete particles (atoms or molecules). These discrete particles are unrelated to the concept of sound particles. In order for the continuum assumption of matter to be accurate, each sound particle is assumed to carry an indefinitely large number of these discrete particles, such that the contribution of each of these discrete particles is negligible to the behaviour of the sound particle as a whole. The sound particle is an instance of bulk matter that obeys the laws of classical mechanics; that is, it follows Newton's laws of motion for point particles (which are also not atoms or molecules, but are macroscopic objects); and is subject to gravitational force, elastic forces, viscous forces, and other emergent forces that affect bulk matter but are irrelevant to individual atoms or molecules. Sound particles, as bulk matter, are additionally subject to the laws of thermodynamics.

== See also ==
- Sound
- Particle displacement
- Particle velocity
- Particle acceleration
