= Audio frequency =

Sound whose frequency is audible to the average human

Sound measurements
- Characteristic: Symbols
- Sound pressure: p, SPL, L_{PA}
- Particle velocity: v, SVL
- Particle displacement: δ
- Sound intensity: I, SIL
- Sound power: P, SWL, L_{WA}
- Sound energy: W
- Sound energy density: w
- Sound exposure: E, SEL
- Acoustic impedance: Z
- Audio frequency: AF
- Transmission loss: TL

An audio frequency or audible frequency (AF) is a periodic vibration whose frequency is audible to the average human. The SI unit of frequency is the hertz (Hz). It is the property of sound that most determines pitch.

The generally accepted standard hearing range for humans is 20 to 20,000 Hz (20 kHz). In air at atmospheric pressure, these represent sound waves with wavelengths of 17 metres (56 ft) to 1.7 centimetres (0.67 in). Frequencies below 20 Hz are generally felt rather than heard, assuming the amplitude of the vibration is great enough. Sound waves that have frequencies below 20 Hz are called infrasonic and those above 20 kHz are called ultrasonic.

Sound propagates as mechanical vibration waves of pressure and displacement, in air or other substances. In general, frequency components of a sound determine its "color", its timbre. When speaking about the frequency (in singular) of a sound, it means the property that most determines its pitch. Higher pitches have higher frequency, and lower pitches have lower frequency.

The frequencies an ear can hear are limited to a specific range of frequencies. The audible frequency range for humans is typically given as being between about 20 Hz and 20,000 Hz (20 kHz), though the high frequency limit usually reduces with age. Other species have different hearing ranges. For example, some dog breeds can perceive vibrations up to 60,000 Hz (60 kHz).

In many media, such as air, the speed of sound is approximately independent of frequency, so the wavelength of the sound waves (distance between repetitions) is approximately inversely proportional to frequency.

== Frequencies and descriptions ==
Frequency (Hz)	Octave	Description
16 to 32	1st	The lower human threshold of hearing, and the lowest pedal notes of a pipe organ.
32 to 512	2nd to 5th	Rhythm frequencies, where the lower and upper bass notes lie.
512 to 2,048	6th to 7th	Defines human speech intelligibility, gives a horn-like or tinny quality to sound.
2,048 to 8,192	8th to 9th	Gives presence to speech, where labial and fricative sounds lie.
8,192 to 16,384	10th	Brilliance, the sounds of bells and the ringing of cymbals and sibilance in speech.
16,384 to 32,768	11th	Beyond brilliance, nebulous sounds approaching and just passing the upper human threshold of hearing

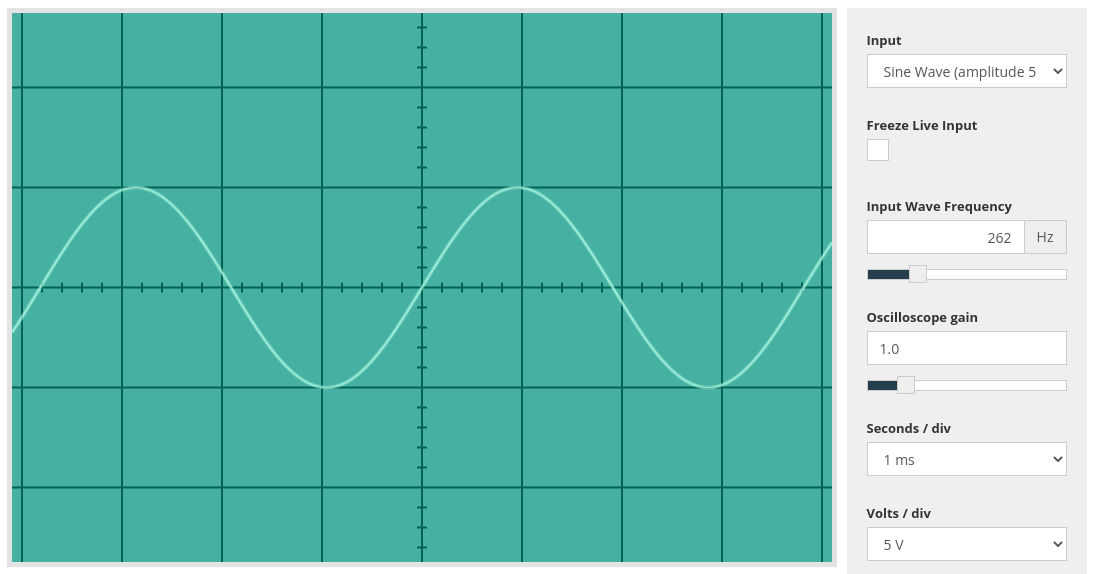
Oscillogram of a pure tone middle C (262 Hz). (Scale: 1 square is equal to 1 millisecond)

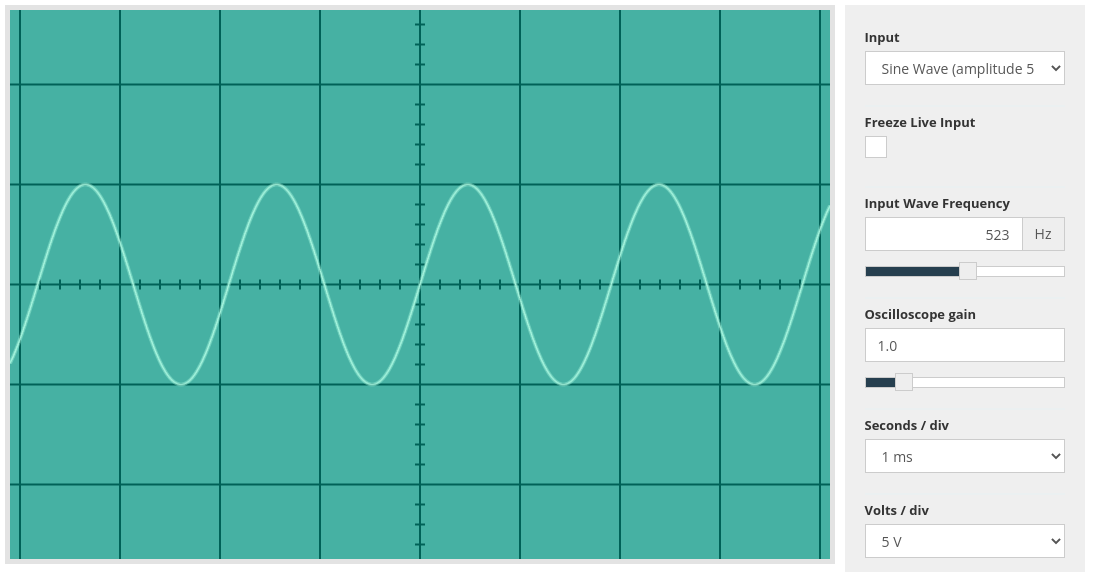
C5, an octave above middle C. The frequency is twice that of middle C (523 Hz).

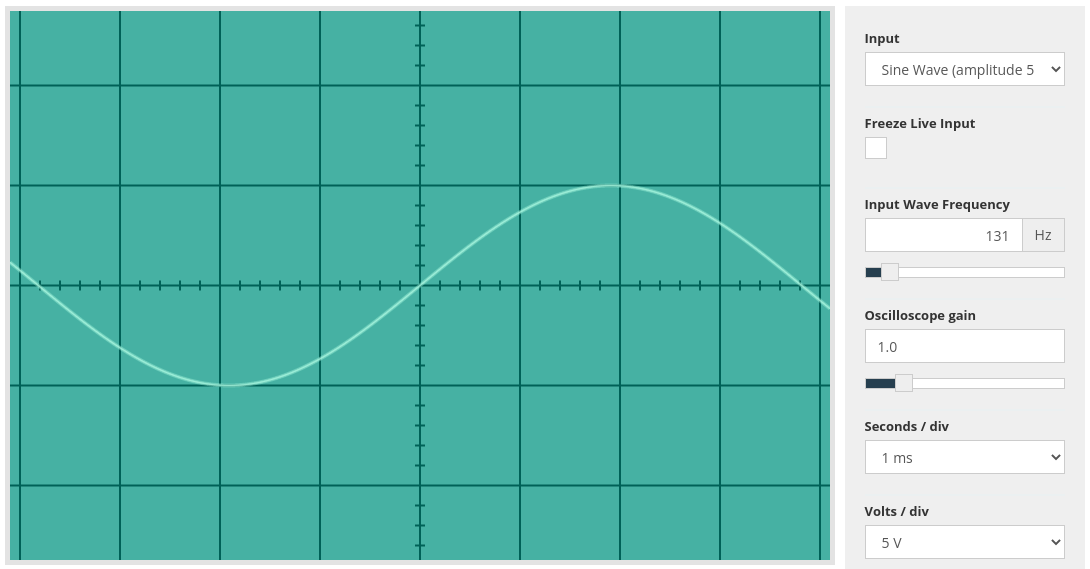
C3, an octave below middle C. The frequency is half that of middle C (131 Hz).

MIDI note	Frequency (Hz)	Description	Sound file
0	8.17578125	Lowest organ note	n/a (fundamental frequency inaudible)
12	16.3515625	Lowest note for tuba, large pipe organs, Bösendorfer Imperial grand piano	n/a (fundamental frequency inaudible under average conditions)
24	32.703125	Lowest C on a standard 88-key piano	
36	65.40625	Lowest note for cello	
48	130.8125	Lowest note for viola, mandola	
60	261.625	Middle C	
72	523.25	C in middle of treble clef	
84	1,046.5	Approximately the highest note reproducible by the average female human voice	
96	2,093	Highest note for a flute	
108	4,186	Highest note on a standard 88-key piano	
120	8,372		
132	16,744	Approximately the tone that a typical CRT television emits while running.	

== See also ==
- Absolute threshold of hearing
- Hypersonic effect, controversial claim for human perception above 20,000 Hz
- Loudspeaker
- Musical acoustics
- Piano key frequencies
- Scientific pitch notation
- Whistle register
