= Particle displacement =

Movement of a sound particle

Sound measurements
- Characteristic: Symbols
- Sound pressure: p, SPL, L_{PA}
- Particle velocity: v, SVL
- Particle displacement: δ
- Sound intensity: I, SIL
- Sound power: P, SWL, L_{WA}
- Sound energy: W
- Sound energy density: w
- Sound exposure: E, SEL
- Acoustic impedance: Z
- Audio frequency: AF
- Transmission loss: TL

Particle displacement or displacement amplitude is a measurement of distance of the movement of a sound particle from its equilibrium position in a medium as it transmits a sound wave. The SI unit of particle displacement is the metre (m). In most cases this is a longitudinal wave of pressure (such as sound), but it can also be a transverse wave, such as the vibration of a taut string. In the case of a sound wave travelling through air, the particle displacement is evident in the oscillations of air molecules with, and against, the direction in which the sound wave is travelling.

A particle of the medium undergoes displacement according to the particle velocity of the sound wave traveling through the medium, while the sound wave itself moves at the speed of sound, equal to 343 m/s in air at 20 °C.

== Mathematical definition ==
Particle displacement, denoted δ, is given by

$$\mathbf \delta = \int_{t} \mathbf v\, \mathrm{d}t$$

where v is the particle velocity.

== Progressive sine waves ==
The particle displacement of a progressive sine wave is given by

$$\delta(\mathbf{r},\, t) = \delta \sin(\mathbf{k} \cdot \mathbf{r} - \omega t + \varphi_{\delta, 0}),$$

where

- $\delta$ is the amplitude of the particle displacement;
- $\varphi_{\delta, 0}$ is the phase shift of the particle displacement;
- $\mathbf{k}$ is the angular wavevector;
- $\omega$ is the angular frequency.

It follows that the particle velocity and the sound pressure along the direction of propagation of the sound wave x are given by

$$v(\mathbf{r},\, t) = \frac{\partial \delta(\mathbf{r},\, t)}{\partial t} = \omega \delta \cos\!\left(\mathbf{k} \cdot \mathbf{r} - \omega t + \varphi_{\delta, 0} + \frac{\pi}{2}\right) = v \cos(\mathbf{k} \cdot \mathbf{r} - \omega t + \varphi_{v, 0}),$$
$$p(\mathbf{r},\, t) = -\rho c^2 \frac{\partial \delta(\mathbf{r},\, t)}{\partial x} = \rho c^2 k_x \delta \cos\!\left(\mathbf{k} \cdot \mathbf{r} - \omega t + \varphi_{\delta, 0} + \frac{\pi}{2}\right) = p \cos(\mathbf{k} \cdot \mathbf{r} - \omega t + \varphi_{p, 0}),$$

where

- $v$ is the amplitude of the particle velocity;
- $\varphi_{v, 0}$ is the phase shift of the particle velocity;
- $p$ is the amplitude of the acoustic pressure;
- $\varphi_{p, 0}$ is the phase shift of the acoustic pressure.

Taking the Laplace transforms of v and p with respect to time yields

$$\hat{v}(\mathbf{r},\, s) = v \frac{s \cos \varphi_{v,0} - \omega \sin \varphi_{v,0}}{s^2 + \omega^2},$$
$$\hat{p}(\mathbf{r},\, s) = p \frac{s \cos \varphi_{p,0} - \omega \sin \varphi_{p,0}}{s^2 + \omega^2}.$$

Since $\varphi_{v,0} = \varphi_{p,0}$, the amplitude of the specific acoustic impedance is given by

$$z(\mathbf{r},\, s) = |z(\mathbf{r},\, s)| = \left|\frac{\hat{p}(\mathbf{r},\, s)}{\hat{v}(\mathbf{r},\, s)}\right| = \frac{p}{v} = \frac{\rho c^2 k_x}{\omega}.$$

Consequently, the amplitude of the particle displacement is related to those of the particle velocity and the sound pressure by

$$\delta = \frac{v}{\omega},$$
$$\delta = \frac{p}{\omega z(\mathbf{r},\, s)}.$$

== See also ==
- Sound
- Sound particle
- Particle velocity
- Particle acceleration

== References and notes ==
Related Reading:

- Wood, Robert Williams (1914). Physical optics. New York: The Macmillan Company.
- Strong, John Donovan & Hayward, Roger (January 2004). Concepts of Classical Optics. Dover Publications. ISBN 978-0-486-43262-5.
- Barron, Randall F. (January 2003). Industrial noise control and acoustics. NYC, New York: CRC Press. pp. 79, 82, 83, 87. ISBN 978-0-8247-0701-9.
