= Sound energy =

Form of energy that can be heard by living things

Sound measurements
- Characteristic: Symbols
- Sound pressure: p, SPL, L_{PA}
- Particle velocity: v, SVL
- Particle displacement: δ
- Sound intensity: I, SIL
- Sound power: P, SWL, L_{WA}
- Sound energy: W
- Sound energy density: w
- Sound exposure: E, SEL
- Acoustic impedance: Z
- Audio frequency: AF
- Transmission loss: TL

Sound energy is the energy carried by longitudinal mechanical waves in elastic media. The energy is periodically converted between kinetic energy and elastic potential energy of material points during the course of the wave's propagation. Only those waves that have a frequency of 20 Hz to 20 kHz are audible to humans. However, this range is an average and will slightly change from individual to individual. Sound waves that have frequencies below 20 Hz are called infrasonic waves and those above 20 kHz are called ultrasonic waves.

Consequently, the sound energy in a volume of interest is defined as the sum of the potential and kinetic energy densities integrated over that volume:

$$W = W_\mathrm{potential} + W_\mathrm{kinetic} = \int_V \frac{p^2}{2 \rho_0 c^2}\, \mathrm{d}V + \int_V \frac{\rho v^2}{2}\, \mathrm{d}V,$$

where

- V is the volume of interest;
- p is the sound pressure;
- v is the particle velocity;
- ρ_{0} is the density of the medium without sound present;
- ρ is the local density of the medium; and
- c is the speed of sound.

== See also ==
- Sound energy density
