= Sound energy density =

Sound measurements
- Characteristic: Symbols
- Sound pressure: p, SPL, L_{PA}
- Particle velocity: v, SVL
- Particle displacement: δ
- Sound intensity: I, SIL
- Sound power: P, SWL, L_{WA}
- Sound energy: W
- Sound energy density: w
- Sound exposure: E, SEL
- Acoustic impedance: Z
- Audio frequency: AF
- Transmission loss: TL

Sound energy density or sound density is the sound energy per unit volume. The SI unit of sound energy density is the pascal (Pa), which is 1 kg⋅m^{−1}⋅s^{−2} in SI base units or 1 joule per cubic metre (J/m^{3}).

== Mathematical definition ==
Sound energy density, denoted w, is defined by

$$w = \frac{p v}{c}$$

where

- p is the sound pressure;
- v is the particle velocity in the direction of propagation;
- c is the speed of sound.

The terms instantaneous energy density, maximum energy density, and peak energy density have meanings analogous to the related terms used for sound pressure. In speaking of average energy density, it is necessary to distinguish between the space average (at a given instant) and the time average (at a given point).

== Sound energy density level ==
The sound energy density level gives the ratio of a sound incidence as a sound energy value in comparison to the reference level of 1 pPa (= 10^{−12} pascals). It is a logarithmic measure of the ratio of two sound energy densities. A unit of the sound energy density level is the decibel (dB), a non-SI unit.

The sound energy density level, L(E), for a given sound energy density, E_{1}, in pascals, is

$$L(E) = 10\, \log_{10}\left(\frac{E_1}{E_0}\right) ~ \text{dB}$$,

where E_{0} is the standard reference sound energy density

$E_0 = 10^{-12}\ \mathrm{Pa}$ .

== See also ==
- Particle velocity level
- Sound intensity level
