= Sound power =

Rate at which sound energy is reflected or transmitted per unit time

Sound measurements
- Characteristic: Symbols
- Sound pressure: p, SPL, L_{PA}
- Particle velocity: v, SVL
- Particle displacement: δ
- Sound intensity: I, SIL
- Sound power: P, SWL, L_{WA}
- Sound energy: W
- Sound energy density: w
- Sound exposure: E, SEL
- Acoustic impedance: Z
- Audio frequency: AF
- Transmission loss: TL

Sound power or acoustic power is the rate at which sound energy is emitted, reflected, transmitted or received, per unit time. It is defined as "through a surface, the product of the sound pressure, and the component of the particle velocity, at a point on the surface in the direction normal to the surface, integrated over that surface." The SI unit of sound power is the watt (W). It relates to the power of the sound force on a surface enclosing a sound source, in air.

For a sound source, unlike sound pressure, sound power is neither room-dependent nor distance-dependent. Sound pressure is a property of the field at a point in space, while sound power is a property of a sound source, equal to the total power emitted by that source in all directions. Sound power passing through an area is sometimes called sound flux or acoustic flux through that area.

== Sound power level L_{WA} ==
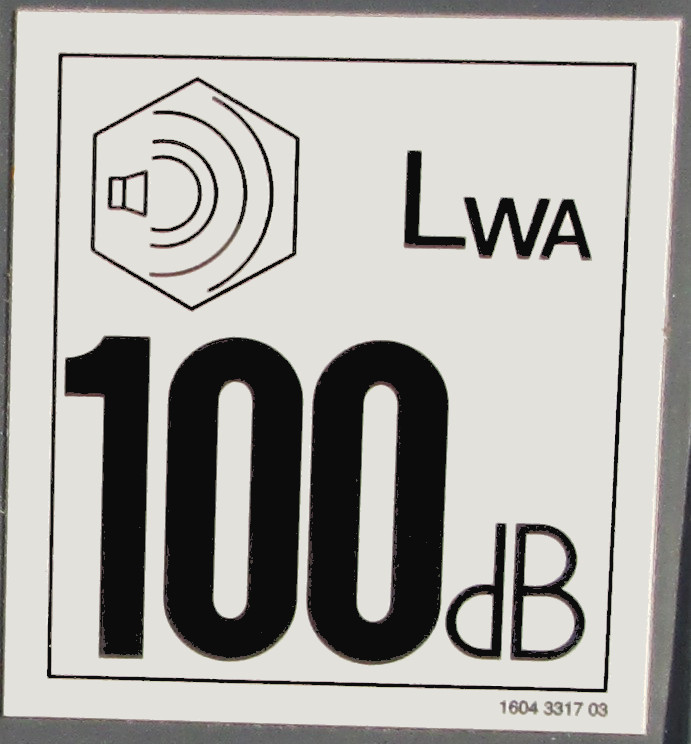
Maximum sound power level (L_{WA}) related to a portable air compressor

Regulations often specify a method for measurement that integrates sound pressure over a surface enclosing the source. L_{WA} specifies the power delivered to that surface in decibels relative to one picowatt. Devices (e.g., a vacuum cleaner) often have labeling requirements and maximum amounts they are allowed to produce. The A-weighting scale is used in the calculation as the metric is concerned with the loudness as perceived by the human ear. Measurements in accordance with ISO 3744 are taken at 6 to 12 defined points around the device in a hemi-anechoic space. The test environment can be located indoors or outdoors. The required environment is on hard ground in a large open space or hemi-anechoic chamber (free-field over a reflecting plane.)

=== Table of selected sound sources ===
Below is a table of some examples, from an on-line source. For omnidirectional point sources in free space, sound power in L_{WA} is equal to sound pressure level in dB above 20 micropascals at a distance of 0.2821 m

Situation and sound source	Sound power (W)	Sound power level (dB ref 10^{−12} W)
Saturn V rocket	100000000	200
Turbojet engine	100000	170
Turbofan aircraft at take-off	1000	150
Turboprop aircraft at take-off	100	140
Machine gun Large pipe organ	10	130
Symphony orchestra Heavy thunder Sonic boom	1	120
Rock concert Chain saw Accelerating motorcycle	0.1	110
Lawn mower Car at highway speed Subway steel wheels	0.01	100
Large diesel vehicle	0.001	90
Loud alarm clock	0.0001	80
Relatively quiet vacuum cleaner	10^{−5}	70
Hair dryer	10^{−6}	60
Radio or TV	10^{−7}	50
Refrigerator; Low voice	10^{−8}	40
Quiet conversation	10^{−9}	30
Whisper of one person Wristwatch ticking	10^{−10}	20
Human breath of one person	10^{−11}	10
Reference value	10^{−12}	0

== Mathematical definition ==
Sound power, denoted P, is defined by
$$P = \mathbf f \cdot \mathbf v = Ap\, \mathbf u \cdot \mathbf v = Apv$$
where

f is the sound force of unit vector u;
v is the particle velocity of projection v along u;
A is the area;
p is the sound pressure.

In a medium, the sound power is given by
$$P = \frac{A p^2}{\rho c} \cos \theta,$$
where

A is the area of the surface;
ρ is the mass density;
c is the sound velocity;
θ is the angle between the direction of propagation of the sound and the normal to the surface;
p is the sound pressure.

For example, a sound at SPL = 85 dB or p = 0.356 Pa in air (ρ = 1.2 kg⋅m^{−3} and c = 343 m⋅s^{−1}) through a surface of area A = 1 m^{2} normal to the direction of propagation (θ = 0°) has a sound energy flux P = 0.3 mW.

This is the parameter one would be interested in when converting noise back into usable energy, along with any losses in the capturing device.

== Relationships with other quantities ==
Sound power is related to sound intensity:
$$P = AI,$$
where

A stands for the area;
I stands for the sound intensity.

Sound power is related sound energy density:
$$P = Acw,$$
where

c stands for the speed of sound;
w stands for the sound energy density.

== Sound power level ==
Sound power level (SWL) or acoustic power level is a logarithmic measure of the power of a sound relative to a reference value.
Sound power level, denoted L_{W} and measured in dB, is defined by:
$$L_W = \frac{1}{2} \ln\!\left(\frac{P}{P_0}\right)\!~\mathrm{Np} = \log_{10}\!\left(\frac{P}{P_0}\right)\!~\mathrm{B} = 10 \log_{10}\!\left(\frac{P}{P_0}\right)\!~\mathrm{dB},$$
where

P is the sound power;
P_{0} is the reference sound power;
1 Np = 1 is the neper;
1 B = 1/2 ln 10 is the bel;
1 dB = 1/20 ln 10 is the decibel.

The commonly used reference sound power in air is
$$P_0 = 1~\mathrm{pW}.$$
The proper notations for sound power level using this reference are L_{W/(1 pW)} or L_{W} (re 1 pW), but the suffix notations dB SWL, dB(SWL), dBSWL, or dB_{SWL} are very common, even if they are not accepted by the SI.

The reference sound power P_{0} is defined as the sound power with the reference sound intensity I_{0} = 1 pW/m^{2} passing through a surface of area A_{0} = 1 m^{2}:
$$P_0 = A_0 I_0,$$
hence the reference value P_{0} = 1 pW.

=== Relationship with sound pressure level ===
The generic calculation of sound power from sound pressure is as follows:
$$L_W = L_p + 10 \log_{10}\!\left(\frac{A_S}{A_0}\right)\!~\mathrm{dB},$$
where A_{S} defines the area of a surface that wholly encompasses the source. This surface may be any shape, but it must fully enclose the source.

In the case of a sound source located in free field positioned over a reflecting plane (i.e. the ground), in air at ambient temperature, the sound power level at distance r from the sound source is approximately related to sound pressure level (SPL) by
$$L_W = L_p + 10 \log_{10}\!\left(\frac{2\pi r^2}{A_0}\right)\!~\mathrm{dB},$$
where

L_{p} is the sound pressure level;
A_{0} = 1 m^{2};
2πr^{2} defines the surface area of a hemisphere; and
r must be sufficient that the hemisphere fully encloses the source.

Derivation of this equation:
$$\begin{align}
L_W &= \frac{1}{2} \ln\!\left(\frac{P}{P_0}\right)\\
&= \frac{1}{2} \ln\!\left(\frac{AI}{A_0 I_0}\right)\\
&= \frac{1}{2} \ln\!\left(\frac{I}{I_0}\right) + \frac{1}{2} \ln\!\left(\frac{A}{A_0}\right)\!.
\end{align}$$
For a progressive spherical wave,

z_{0} = p/v is the characteristic specific acoustic impedance;
A = 4πr^{2} is the surface area of a sphere.

Consequently,
$$I = pv = \frac{p^2}{z_0},$$
and since by definition I_{0} = p_{0}^{2}/z_{0}, where p_{0} = 20 μPa is the reference sound pressure,
$$\begin{align}
L_W &= \frac{1}{2} \ln\!\left(\frac{p^2}{p_0^2}\right) + \frac{1}{2} \ln\!\left(\frac{4\pi r^2}{A_0}\right)\\
&= \ln\!\left(\frac{p}{p_0}\right) + \frac{1}{2} \ln\!\left(\frac{4\pi r^2}{A_0}\right)\\
&= L_p + 10 \log_{10}\!\left(\frac{4\pi r^2}{A_0}\right)\!~\mathrm{dB}.
\end{align}$$

The sound power estimated practically does not depend on distance. The sound pressure used in the calculation may be affected by distance due to viscous effects in the propagation of sound unless this is accounted for.
