= Particle velocity =

Velocity of a particle in a medium as it transmits a wave

Sound measurements
- Characteristic: Symbols
- Sound pressure: p, SPL, L_{PA}
- Particle velocity: v, SVL
- Particle displacement: δ
- Sound intensity: I, SIL
- Sound power: P, SWL, L_{WA}
- Sound energy: W
- Sound energy density: w
- Sound exposure: E, SEL
- Acoustic impedance: Z
- Audio frequency: AF
- Transmission loss: TL

Particle velocity (denoted v or SVL) is the velocity of a particle (real or imagined) in a medium as it transmits a wave. The SI unit of particle velocity is the metre per second (m/s). In many cases this is a longitudinal wave of pressure as with sound, but it can also be a transverse wave as with the vibration of a taut string.

When applied to a sound wave through a medium of a fluid like air, particle velocity would be the physical speed of a parcel of fluid as it moves back and forth in the direction the sound wave is travelling as it passes.

Particle velocity should not be confused with the speed of the wave as it passes through the medium, i.e. in the case of a sound wave, particle velocity is not the same as the speed of sound. The wave moves relatively fast, while the particles oscillate around their original position with a relatively small particle velocity. Particle velocity should also not be confused with the velocity of individual molecules, which depends mostly on the temperature and molecular mass.

In applications involving sound, the particle velocity is usually measured using a logarithmic decibel scale called particle velocity level. Mostly pressure sensors (microphones) are used to measure sound pressure which is then propagated to the velocity field using Green's function.

== Mathematical definition ==
Particle velocity, denoted $\mathbf v$, is defined by

$$\mathbf v = \frac{\partial \mathbf \delta}{\partial t}$$

where $\delta$ is the particle displacement.

== Progressive sine waves ==
The particle displacement of a progressive sine wave is given by

$$\delta(\mathbf{r},\, t) = \delta_\mathrm{m} \cos(\mathbf{k} \cdot \mathbf{r} - \omega t + \varphi_{\delta, 0}),$$

where

- $\delta_\mathrm{m}$ is the amplitude of the particle displacement;
- $\varphi_{\delta, 0}$ is the phase shift of the particle displacement;
- $\mathbf{k}$ is the angular wavevector;
- $\omega$ is the angular frequency.

It follows that the particle velocity and the sound pressure along the direction of propagation of the sound wave x are given by

$$v(\mathbf{r},\, t) = \frac{\partial \delta(\mathbf{r},\, t)}{\partial t} = \omega \delta \cos\!\left(\mathbf{k} \cdot \mathbf{r} - \omega t + \varphi_{\delta, 0} + \frac{\pi}{2}\right) = v_\mathrm{m} \cos(\mathbf{k} \cdot \mathbf{r} - \omega t + \varphi_{v, 0}),$$
$$p(\mathbf{r},\, t) = -\rho c^2 \frac{\partial \delta(\mathbf{r},\, t)}{\partial x} = \rho c^2 k_x \delta \cos\!\left(\mathbf{k} \cdot \mathbf{r} - \omega t + \varphi_{\delta, 0} + \frac{\pi}{2}\right) = p_\mathrm{m} \cos(\mathbf{k} \cdot \mathbf{r} - \omega t + \varphi_{p, 0}),$$

where

- $v_\mathrm{m}$ is the amplitude of the particle velocity;
- $\varphi_{v, 0}$ is the phase shift of the particle velocity;
- $p_\mathrm{m}$ is the amplitude of the acoustic pressure;
- $\varphi_{p, 0}$ is the phase shift of the acoustic pressure.

Taking the Laplace transforms of $v$ and $p$ with respect to time yields

$$\hat{v}(\mathbf{r},\, s) = v_\mathrm{m} \frac{s \cos \varphi_{v,0} - \omega \sin \varphi_{v,0}}{s^2 + \omega^2},$$
$$\hat{p}(\mathbf{r},\, s) = p_\mathrm{m} \frac{s \cos \varphi_{p,0} - \omega \sin \varphi_{p,0}}{s^2 + \omega^2}.$$

Since $\varphi_{v,0} = \varphi_{p,0}$, the amplitude of the specific acoustic impedance is given by

$$z_\mathrm{m}(\mathbf{r},\, s) = |z(\mathbf{r},\, s)| = \left|\frac{\hat{p}(\mathbf{r},\, s)}{\hat{v}(\mathbf{r},\, s)}\right| = \frac{p_\mathrm{m}}{v_\mathrm{m}} = \frac{\rho c^2 k_x}{\omega}.$$

Consequently, the amplitude of the particle velocity is related to those of the particle displacement and the sound pressure by

$$v_\mathrm{m} = \omega \delta_\mathrm{m},$$
$$v_\mathrm{m} = \frac{p_\mathrm{m}}{z_\mathrm{m}(\mathbf{r},\, s)}.$$

== Particle velocity level ==
Sound velocity level (SVL) or acoustic velocity level or particle velocity level is a logarithmic measure of the effective particle velocity of a sound relative to a reference value.
Sound velocity level, denoted L_{v} and measured in dB, is defined by

$$L_v = \ln\!\left(\frac{v}{v_0}\right)\!~\mathrm{Np} = 2 \log_{10}\!\left(\frac{v}{v_0}\right)\!~\mathrm{B} = 20 \log_{10}\!\left(\frac{v}{v_0}\right)\!~\mathrm{dB},$$

where

- v is the root mean square particle velocity;
- v_{0} is the reference particle velocity;
- 1 Np = 1 is the neper;
- 1 B = 1/2 ln 10 is the bel;
- 1 dB = 1/20 ln 10 is the decibel.

The commonly used reference particle velocity in air is

$$v_0 = 5 \times 10^{-8}~\mathrm{m/s}.$$

The proper notations for sound velocity level using this reference are L_{v/(5 × 10^{−8} m/s)} or L_{v} (re 5 × 10^{−8} m/s), but the notations dB SVL, dB(SVL), dBSVL, or dB_{SVL} are very common, even though they are not accepted by the SI.

== See also ==
- Sound
- Sound particle
- Particle displacement
- Particle acceleration
