= Sound exposure =

Sound measurements
- Characteristic: Symbols
- Sound pressure: p, SPL, L_{PA}
- Particle velocity: v, SVL
- Particle displacement: δ
- Sound intensity: I, SIL
- Sound power: P, SWL, L_{WA}
- Sound energy: W
- Sound energy density: w
- Sound exposure: E, SEL
- Acoustic impedance: Z
- Audio frequency: AF
- Transmission loss: TL

Sound exposure is the integral, over time, of squared sound pressure. The SI unit of sound exposure is the pascal squared second (Pa^{2}·s).

== Mathematical definition ==
Sound exposure, denoted E, is defined by

$$E = \int_{t_0}^{t_1} p(t)^2\, \mathrm{d}t,$$

where

- the exposure is being calculated for the time interval between times t_{0} and t_{1};
- p(t) is the sound pressure at time t, usually A-weighted for sound in air.

== Sound exposure level ==
Sound exposure level (SEL) is a logarithmic measure of the sound exposure of a sound relative to a reference value.
Sound exposure level, denoted L_{E} and measured in dB, is defined by

$$L_E = \frac{1}{2} \ln\!\left(\frac{E}{E_0}\right)\!~\mathrm{Np} = \log_{10}\!\left(\frac{E}{E_0}\right)\!~\mathrm{B} = 10 \log_{10}\!\left(\frac{E}{E_0}\right)\!~\mathrm{dB},$$

where

- E is the sound exposure;
- E_{0} is the reference sound exposure;
- 1 Np = 1 is the neper;
- 1 B = 1/2 ln 10 is the bel;
- 1 dB = 1/20 ln 10 is the decibel.

The commonly used reference sound exposure in air is

$$E_0 = 400~\mathrm{\mu Pa^2 \cdot s}.$$

The proper notations for sound exposure level using this reference are L_{W/(400 μPa^{2}⋅s)} or L_{W} (re 400 μPa^{2}⋅s), but the notations dB SEL, dB(SEL), dBSEL, or dB_{SEL} are very common, even if they are not accepted by the SI.
