= Sound intensity =

Power carried by sound waves

Sound measurements
- Characteristic: Symbols
- Sound pressure: p, SPL, L_{PA}
- Particle velocity: v, SVL
- Particle displacement: δ
- Sound intensity: I, SIL
- Sound power: P, SWL, L_{WA}
- Sound energy: W
- Sound energy density: w
- Sound exposure: E, SEL
- Acoustic impedance: Z
- Audio frequency: AF
- Transmission loss: TL

Sound intensity, also known as acoustic intensity, is defined as the power carried by sound waves per unit area in a direction perpendicular to that area, also called the sound power density and the sound energy flux density. (Note: IEC 801-21-38) The SI unit of intensity, which includes sound intensity, is the watt per square meter (W/m^{2}). One application is the noise measurement of sound intensity in the air at a listener's location as a sound energy quantity.

Sound intensity is not the same physical quantity as sound pressure. Human hearing is sensitive to sound pressure which is related to sound intensity. In consumer audio electronics, the level differences are called "intensity" differences, but sound intensity is a specifically defined quantity and cannot be sensed by a simple microphone.

Sound intensity level is a logarithmic expression of sound intensity relative to a reference intensity.

== Mathematical definition ==
Sound intensity, denoted I, is defined by
$$\mathbf I = p \mathbf v$$
where

- p is the sound pressure;
- v is the particle velocity.

Both I and v are vectors, which means that both have a direction as well as a magnitude. The direction of sound intensity is the average direction in which energy is flowing.

The average sound intensity during time T is given by
$$\langle \mathbf I\rangle = \frac{1}{T} \int_0^T p(t) \mathbf v(t) \,\mathrm{d}t.$$
For a plane wave,
$$\Iota = 2\pi^2\nu^2 \delta^2 \rho c$$
Where,

- $\nu$ is frequency of sound,
- $\delta$ is the amplitude of the sound wave particle displacement,
- $\rho$ is density of medium in which sound is traveling, and
- $c$ is speed of sound.

== Inverse-square law ==
For a spherical sound wave, the intensity in the radial direction as a function of distance r from the centre of the sphere is given by
$$I(r) = \frac{P}{A(r)} = \frac{P}{4 \pi r^2},$$
where

- P is the sound power;
- A(r) is the surface area of a sphere of radius r.

Thus sound intensity decreases as 1/r^{2} from the centre of the sphere:
$$I(r) \propto \frac{1}{r^2}.$$

This relationship is an inverse-square law.

== Sound intensity level ==
Sound intensity level (SIL) or acoustic intensity level is the level (a logarithmic quantity) of the intensity of a sound relative to a reference value.

It is denoted L_{I}, expressed in nepers, bels, or decibels, and defined by
$$L_I = \frac{1}{2} \ln\left(\frac{I}{I_0}\right) \mathrm{Np} = \log_{10}\left(\frac{I}{I_0}\right)\mathrm{B} = 10 \log_{10}\left(\frac{I}{I_0}\right) \mathrm{dB},$$
where

- I is the sound intensity;
- I_{0} is the reference sound intensity;
  - 1 Np = 1 is the neper;
  - 1 B = 1/2 ln(10) is the bel;
  - 1 dB = 1/20 ln(10) is the decibel.

The international standard reference sound intensity is
$$I_0 = 1~\mathrm{pW/m^2} = 1~\cdot~10^{-12}~\mathrm{W/m^2}.$$

being approximately the lowest sound intensity hearable by an undamaged human ear under room conditions. The proper notations for sound intensity level using this reference are L_{I /(1 pW/m^{2})} or L_{I} (re 1 pW/m^{2}), but the notations dB SIL, dB(SIL), dBSIL, or dB_{SIL} are very common, even though they are not accepted with the SI.

The reference sound intensity I_{0} is defined such that a progressive plane wave in air has the same value of sound intensity level (SIL) and sound pressure level (SPL), since
$$I \propto p^2.$$

The equality of SIL and SPL requires that
$$\frac{I}{I_0} = \frac{p^2}{p_0^2},$$
where p_{0} = 20 μPa is the reference sound pressure in air.

For a progressive spherical wave,
$$\frac{p}{c} = z_0,$$
where z_{0} is the characteristic specific acoustic impedance. Thus,
$$I_0 = \frac{p_0^2 I}{p^2} = \frac{p_0^2 pc}{p^2} = \frac{p_0^2}{z_0}.$$

In air at ambient temperature, z_{0} = 410 Pa·s/m, hence the reference value I_{0} = 1 pW/m^{2}.

In an anechoic chamber which approximates a free field (no reflection) with a single source, measurements in the far field in SPL can be considered to be equal to measurements in SIL. This fact is exploited to measure sound power in anechoic conditions.

== Measurement ==
Sound intensity is defined as the time averaged product of sound pressure and acoustic particle velocity. Both quantities can be directly measured by using a sound intensity p-u probe comprising a microphone and a particle velocity sensor, or estimated indirectly by using a p-p probe that approximates the particle velocity by integrating the pressure gradient between two closely spaced microphones.

Pressure-based measurement methods are widely used in anechoic conditions for noise quantification purposes. The bias error introduced by a p-p probe can be approximated by
$$\widehat{I}^{p-p}_n \simeq I_n - \frac{\varphi_{\text{pe}}\,p_{\text{rms}}^2}{{k\Delta r \rho c}}=I_n \left( 1 - \frac{\varphi_{\text{pe}}}{k \Delta r} \frac{p_{\text{rms}}^2 / \rho c}{I_r}\right) ,$$
where $I_n$ is the “true” intensity (unaffected by calibration errors), $\hat{I}^{p-p}_n$ is the biased estimate obtained using a p-p probe, $p_{\text{rms}}$ is the root-mean-squared value of the sound pressure, $k$ is the wave number, $\rho$ is the density of air, $c$ is the speed of sound and $\Delta r$ is the spacing between the two microphones (assuming measurement in air). This expression shows that phase calibration errors are inversely proportional to frequency and microphone spacing and directly proportional to the ratio of the mean square sound pressure to the sound intensity. If the pressure-to-intensity ratio is large then even a small phase mismatch will lead to significant bias errors. In practice, sound intensity measurements cannot be performed accurately when the pressure-intensity index is high, which limits the use of p-p intensity probes in environments with high levels of background noise or reflections.

On the other hand, the bias error introduced by a p-u probe can be approximated by
$$\hat{I}^{p-u}_n = \frac{1}{2} \operatorname{Re}\left\{{P\hat{V}^*_n}\right\} = \frac{1}{2} \operatorname{Re}\left\{{P V^*_n e^{-j\varphi_{\text{ue}}} }\right\}  \simeq I_n + \varphi_{\text{ue}} J_n  \, ,$$
where $\hat{I}^{p-u}_n$ is the biased estimate obtained using a p-u probe, $P$ and $V_n$ are the Fourier transform of sound pressure and particle velocity, $J_n$ is the reactive intensity and $\varphi_{\text{ue}}$ is the p-u phase mismatch introduced by calibration errors. Therefore, the phase calibration is critical when measurements are carried out under near field conditions, but not so relevant if the measurements are performed out in the far field. The “reactivity” (the ratio of the reactive to the active intensity) indicates whether this source of error is of concern or not. Compared to pressure-based probes, p-u intensity probes are unaffected by the pressure-to-intensity index, enabling the estimation of propagating acoustic energy in unfavorable testing environments provided that the distance to the sound source is sufficient.
