= Power level =

Power level may refer to:

- Level (logarithmic quantity), logarithm of the ratio of the value of some quantity to a reference value of the same quantity.
  - Sound power level
- The act of power-leveling in video games.
- The numerical rating of a character's strength and fighting ability in the Dragon Ball franchise, as in the quote and meme "It's Over 9000!"

== See also ==
- Energy level, allowable discrete values of energy of a bound quantum mechanical system or particle
- Power, root-power, and field quantities, level vs. power measurement units
- Power rating, highest power input allowed to flow through particular equipment
