= Level (logarithmic quantity) =

In science and engineering, a power level and a field level (also called a root-power level) are logarithmic magnitudes of certain quantities referenced to a standard reference value of the same type.

- A power level is a logarithmic quantity used to measure power, power density or sometimes energy, with commonly used unit decibel (dB).
- A field level (or root-power level) is a logarithmic quantity used to measure quantities of which the square is typically proportional to power (for instance, the square of voltage is proportional to power multiplied by the conductor's resistance), with commonly used units neper (Np) or decibel (dB).

The type of level and choice of units indicate the scaling of the logarithm of the ratio between the quantity and its reference value, though a logarithm may be considered to be a dimensionless quantity. The reference values for each type of quantity are often specified by international standards.

Power and field levels are used in electronic engineering, telecommunications, acoustics and related disciplines. Power levels are used for signal power, noise power, sound power, sound exposure, etc. Field levels are used for voltage, current, sound pressure.

== Power level ==
Level of a power quantity, denoted L_{P}, is defined by

$$L_P = \frac{1}{2} \log_{\mathrm{e}}\!\left(\frac{P}{P_0}\right)\!~\mathrm{Np} = \log_{10}\!\left(\frac{P}{P_0}\right)\!~\mathrm{B} = 10 \log_{10}\!\left(\frac{P}{P_0}\right)\!~\mathrm{dB}.$$

where

- P is the power quantity;
- P_{0} is the reference value of P.

== Field (or root-power) level ==
The level of a root-power quantity (also known as a field quantity), denoted L_{F}, is defined by

$$L_F = \log_{\mathrm{e}}\!\left(\frac{F}{F_0}\right)\!~\mathrm{Np} = 2 \log_{10}\!\left(\frac{F}{F_0}\right)\!~\mathrm{B} = 20 \log_{10}\!\left(\frac{F}{F_0}\right)\!~\mathrm{dB}.$$

where

- F is the root-power quantity, proportional to the square root of power quantity;
- F_{0} is the reference value of F.

If the power quantity P is proportional to F^{2}, and if the reference value of the power quantity, P_{0}, is in the same proportion to F_{0}^{2}, the levels L_{F} and L_{P} are equal.

The neper, bel, and decibel (one tenth of a bel) are units of level that are often applied to such quantities as power, intensity, or gain. The neper, bel, and decibel are related by

- 1 B = 1/2 log_{e}10 Np;
- 1 dB = 0.1 B = 1/20 log_{e}10 Np.

== Standards ==
Level and its units are defined in ISO 80000-3.

The ISO standard defines each of the quantities power level and field level to be dimensionless, with 1 Np = 1. This is motivated by simplifying the expressions involved, as in systems of natural units.

== Related quantities ==
=== Logarithmic ratio quantity ===
Power and field quantities are part of a larger class, logarithmic ratio quantities.

ANSI/ASA S1.1-2013 defines a class of quantities it calls levels. It defines a level of a quantity Q, denoted L_{Q}, as

$$L_Q = \log_r\!\left(\frac{Q}{Q_0}\right)\!,$$

where

- r is the base of the logarithm;
- Q is the quantity;
- Q_{0} is the reference value of Q.

For the level of a root-power quantity, the base of the logarithm is r = e. For the level of a power quantity, the base of the logarithm is r = e^{2}.

=== Logarithmic frequency ratio ===
The logarithmic frequency ratio (also known as frequency level) of two frequencies is the logarithm of their ratio, and may be expressed using the unit octave (symbol: oct) corresponding to the ratio 2 or the unit decade (symbol: dec) corresponding to the ratio 10:

$$L_f = \log_2 \!\left( \frac{f}{f_0} \right) ~\text{oct} = \log_{10} \!\left( \frac{f}{f_0} \right) ~\text{dec}.$$

In music theory, the octave is a unit used with logarithm base 2 (called interval). A semitone is one twelfth of an octave. A cent is one hundredth of a semitone. In this context, the reference frequency is taken to be C_{0}, four octaves below middle C.

== See also ==
- Decibel § Definition
- Power, root-power, and field quantities
- Logarithmic scale
- Sound level (disambiguation)
- Leveling (tapered floating point)
- Level-index arithmetic (LI) and symmetric level-index arithmetic (SLI)
