= Octave (electronics) =

Relative unit corresponding to doubling of frequency

In electronics, an octave (symbol: oct) is a logarithmic unit for ratios between frequencies, with one octave corresponding to a doubling of frequency. For example, the frequency one octave above 40 Hz is 80 Hz. The term is derived from the Western musical scale where an octave is a doubling in frequency. (Note: The prefix octa-, denoting eight, refers to the eight notes of a diatonic scale; the association of the word with doubling is solely a matter of customary usage.) Specification in terms of octaves is therefore common in audio electronics.

Along with the decade, it is a unit used to describe frequency bands or frequency ratios.

== Ratios and slopes ==
A frequency ratio expressed in octaves is the base-2 logarithm (binary logarithm) of the ratio:

$$\text{number of octaves} = \log_2\left(\frac{f_2}{f_1}\right)$$

An amplifier or filter may be stated to have a frequency response of ±6 dB per octave over a particular frequency range, which signifies that the power gain changes by ±6 decibels (a factor of 4 in power), when the frequency changes by a factor of 2. This slope, or more precisely 10 log_{10}(4) ≈ 6 decibels per octave, corresponds to an amplitude gain proportional to frequency, which is equivalent to ±20 dB per decade (factor of 10 amplitude gain change for a factor of 10 frequency change). This would be a first-order filter.

== Example ==
The distance between the frequencies 20 Hz and 40 Hz is 1 octave. An amplitude of 52 dB at 4 kHz decreases as frequency increases at −2 dB/oct. What is the amplitude at 13 kHz?

$$\text{number of octaves} = \log_2\left(\frac{13}{4}\right) = 1.7$$

$$\text{Mag}_{13\text{ kHz}} = 52\text{ dB} + (1.7\text{ oct} \times -2\text{ dB/oct}) = 48.6\text{ dB}.\,$$

== See also ==
- Octave
- Octave band
- One-third octave
