= 300C =

300C may refer to:

- Chrysler 300 letter series, specifically the 1957 or 2005 "C" models of that line
- Schweizer (Hughes) 300C, a model of light helicopter
- Nissan 300C, the export version of the Nissan Cedric Y30
