= Kelly kiloton index =

The Kelly Kiloton Index (KKI) was invented by H. A. Kelly of University of California, Los Angeles in 2006 as an alternative to the logarithmic Richter scale (which dates to 1935). Its unit of measurement is the metric kiloton of TNT, which yields a practical measurement of the seismic movement of force which is more understandable by the lay public.
