= Gustave Trouvé =

French electrical engineer and inventor

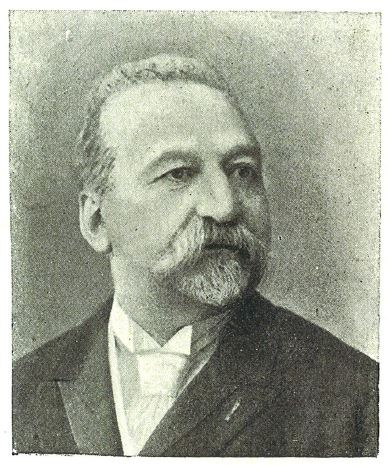
- Gustave Trouvé
- Born: 2 January 1839; La Haye Descartes, France
- Died: 27 July 1902 (aged 63); Paris, France
- Education: Ecole des Arts et Métiers, Angers
- Scientific career
- Fields: Electrical engineering

Signature
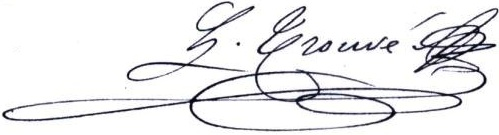

Gustave Pierre Trouvé (2 January 1839 – 27 July 1902) was a French electrical engineer and inventor in the 19th century. A polymath, he was highly respected for his innovative skill in miniaturization.

== Early life and education ==
Gustave Trouvé was born on 2 January 1839 in La Haye-Descartes (Indre-et-Loire, France) into a modest family. His father, Jacques Trouvé, was a cattle dealer. In 1850, he studied to be a locksmith in Chinon College, then from 1854 to 1855 at the École des Arts et Métiers in Angers. His studies were incomplete due to poor health, and he left his local region for Paris where he obtained a job with a clockmaker.

== Paris ==
From 1865 Trouvé set up a workshop in central Paris where he innovated and patented many widely differing applications of electricity, regularly reported on by popular science magazines of the time such as La Nature. He invented a carbon-zinc pocket-sized battery to power his miniature electric automata which soon became very popular. A similar battery was invented and widely commercialized by Georges Leclanché.

== The 1870s ==
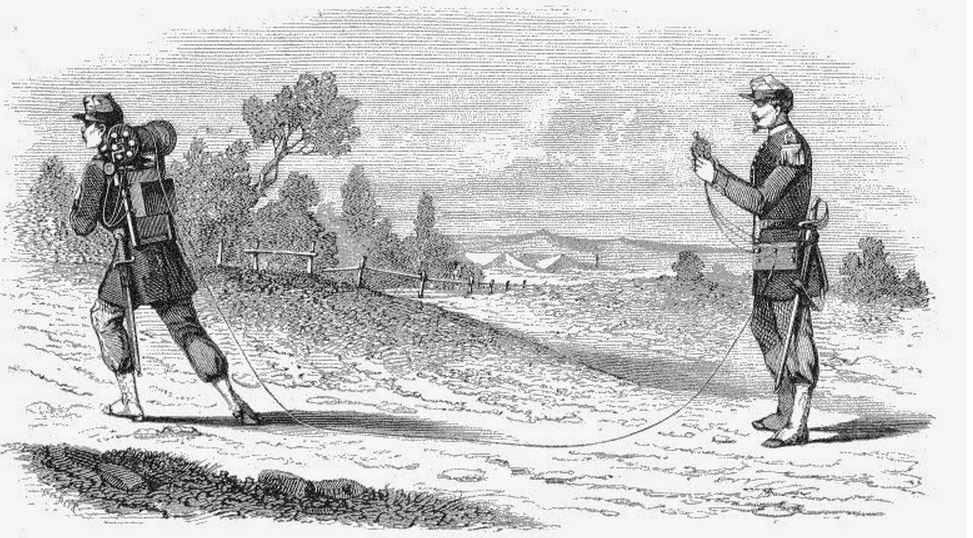
Military telegraph

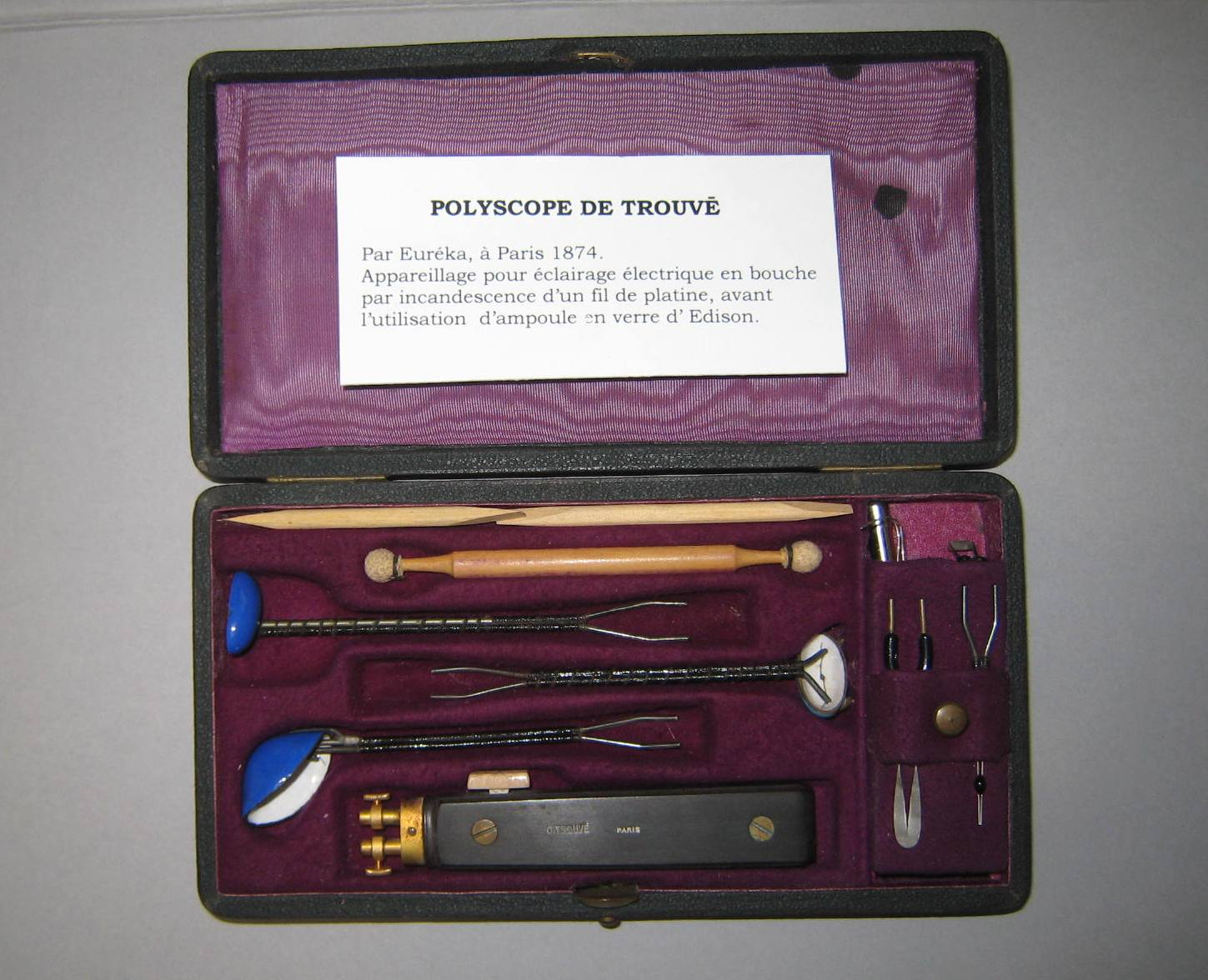
Polyscope

Trouvé took part in the improvement of communication systems with several noteworthy innovations. In 1870, he developed a device for locating metal objects such as bullets in human patients. It used electric conduction, but unlike the one made by Professor Favre in 1862, Trouvé's buzzer made distinct sounds for lead and iron. In 1872 he developed a portable military telegraph whose cabling enabled rapid communication up to a distance of one kilometer, enabling the swift transmission of both orders and reports back from the Front. In 1878, he improved the sound intensity of Alexander Graham Bell's telephone system by incorporating a double membrane. The same year he invented a highly sensitive portable microphone. Trouvé soon came to be known and respected for his talent for miniaturization. The same year, using a battery developed by Gaston Planté, and a small incandescent airtight bulb, he innovated a "polyscope", the prototype of the modern endoscope.

== The 1880s ==
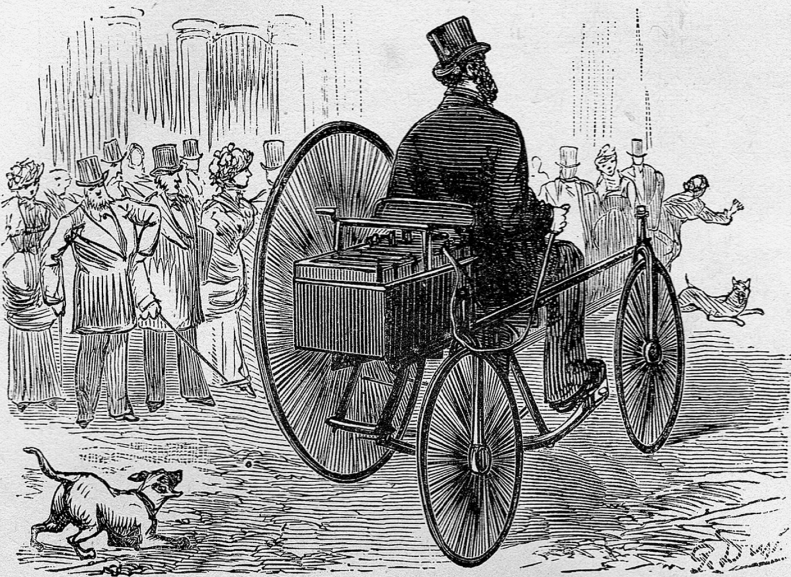
Gustave Trouvé's tricycle, world's first electric car

In 1880 Trouvé improved the efficiency of a small electric motor developed by Siemens and using the recently developed rechargeable battery, fitted it to an English James Starley tricycle, inventing the world's first electric vehicle. Although this was successfully tested on 19 April 1881 along the Rue Valois in central Paris, he was unable to patent it. Trouvé swiftly adapted his battery-powered motor to marine propulsion; to make it easy to carry his marine conversion to and from his workshop to the nearby River Seine, Trouvé made it portable and removable from the boat, thus inventing the outboard engine. On 26 May 1881 the 5m Trouvé prototype, called Le Téléphone, reached a speed of 1 m/s (3.6 km/h) going upstream at 2.5 m/s (9.0 km/h) downstream.

Trouvé exhibited his boat (but not his tricycle) and his electro-medical instruments at the International Electrical Exhibition in Paris and soon after was awarded the Légion d'Honneur. He also miniaturized his electric motor to power a model airship, a dental drill, a sewing machine and a razor.

Trouvé next invented his "Photophore", or battery-powered frontal headlamp, which he developed for a client, Dr Paul Hélot, an ear-nose-and-throat specialist of Rouen. This wearable, direct shaft, lighting system could be oriented by head movements, freeing the hands of its wearer. A file of correspondence between these two men enables one to place this invention during 1883. Trouvé soon modified their frontal headlamp both for use by miners, rescue workers, and later by speleologists, in dark surroundings, but also by tinting the light with various colors as theater jewelry for artiste troupes in Paris and Europe. The latter became known as "luminous electric jewels" and was the forerunner of today's wearable technology.

In 1884, Trouvé fitted an electric boat with both an electric horn and a bow-mounted frontal headlamp, the first time such electrical accessories had ever been fitted on any mode of transport. He developed a portable electric safety lamp. In 1887, Trouvé, whose brand name was 'Eureka' (Greek: εὕρηκα, lit. 'I have found', in French: J’ai trouvé), developed his auxanoscope, an electric slide projector for itinerant teachers (1887).

Around the same period, Trouvé, a confirmed bachelor uninterested in commercialization, turned his fertile mind skywards. Convinced that the future lay with heavier-than-air machines, he flew a tethered model electric helicopter, the ancestor of the Sikorsky Firefly.

He next built an ornithopter, the wings of which flapped using a rapid succession of gun cartridges, enabling it to make a noisy but at the time unheard-of flight of 80 meters.

In 1889, he also fitted the battery-electric rifle he had developed in 1866, with a frontal light enabling nocturnal hunting. He also developed a battery-electric alarm system for nocturnal fishing.

== The 1890s ==
In 1891 Trouvé developed electric multi-colored fountains for domestic and outdoor use. Seeing the limitations of electrical supply without the reliable support of a national grid, in 1895 he took the recent discovery of acetylene light and soon harnessed it for domestic lighting. Among his 75 innovations,(see below) he also developed an electric massaging machine, an electric keyboard instrument based on Savart's wheel, a battery-powered wearable lifejacket, a water-jet propelled boat and a streamlined bicycle, as well as several children's toys.

In 1902, Trouvé was working on his latest innovation, a small portable device which used ultra-violet light to treat skin diseases, the prototype of PUVA therapy when he accidentally cut his thumb and index finger. Neglecting the wound, sepsis set in and after amputations at the Saint-Louis Hospital, Paris, the 63-year-old inventor died on 27 July 1902.

== Disappearance and rehabilitation ==
When the obligatory concession for Trouvé's tomb in the cemetery of his native town of Descartes was not renewed, Trouvé's remains were thrown into the common grave. His archives were destroyed in February 1980 during an accidental fire in the Town Hall.

In 2012, following a French biography by English transport historian Kevin Desmond, a commemorative plaque was officially unveiled on the site of his birthplace. Four years later, following an extended English-language biography, on 15 October 2016, a second plaque was officially unveiled by Desmond and Jacques Boutault, Mayor of Paris 2nd District, on the wall outside his former workshop, 14 rue Vivienne. The search for rare surviving examples of his instruments has become worldwide. On 24 September a Trouvé/Cadet-Picard gold skull stick pin automaton sold at Bonhams of London for $8,000. An exhibition celebrating the 180th anniversary of his birth, entitled "Gustave Trouvé, the da Vinci of the 19th Century", took place at his birthplace in Descartes, France during the month of May 2019. Of his original instruments, 16 were brought together, while a line-up of modern electric cars, boats, drones and bicycles were assembled in his honour. In 2020, A Canadian website Plugboats.com launched a competition to vote online for the best electric boats of the year calling it the Gustave Trouvé Award. The medals portraying Trouvé were called the Gussies (Gustave). Over 4,000 people voted between May and July 2020. In April 2021 Christian Richards, a British classic bicycle engineer, built a replica of Trouvé's tricycle and tested it along the rue Valois, Paris 2ème 140 years after Trouvé had made his trials with the original. The British Media reportage headlined Trouvé as the inventor of the first electric vehicle. In October 2022, 15,000 people voted for a line-up more than 100 Gussie boats from 21 countries and every continent except Antarctica entered. The same month, Christian Richards delivered a second tricycle to Descartes for its second exhibition about Trouvé which welcomed over 400 visitors and 110 local primary and secondary school children. In November a Trouvé museum having been unanimously validated by the Town Council, entered a Touraine regional election for 157 projects, including 10 projects in the Indre-e-Loire district of which Descartes's Trouvé Museum was one. By midnight on 30 November, the Trouvé candidature had received 366 votes in 1st place, 73 votes ahead of the second commune of Preuilly sur Claise. The Museum was opened on May 15, 2024. Among its latest acquisitions is a working replica based on Trouvé's electric piano patent of 1894. The search continues for examples of his other inventions (see list below).

== Inventions and innovations in chronological order ==
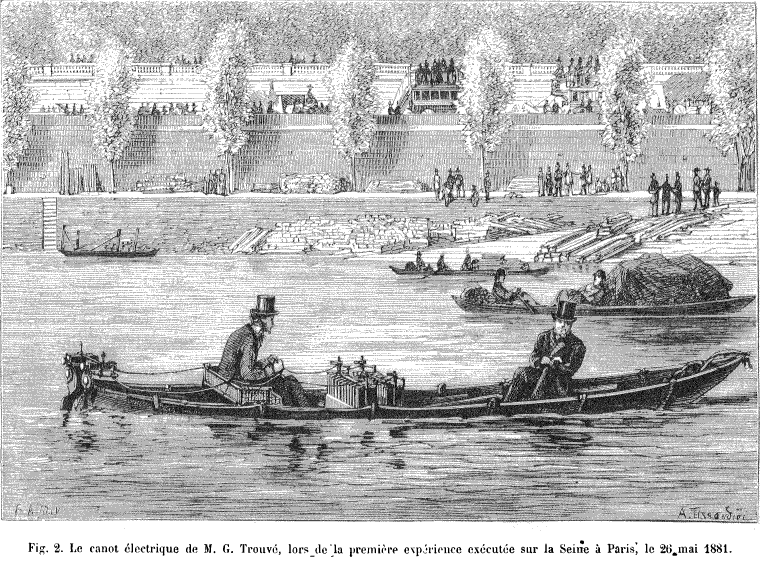
Outboard motorboat of Gustave Trouvé

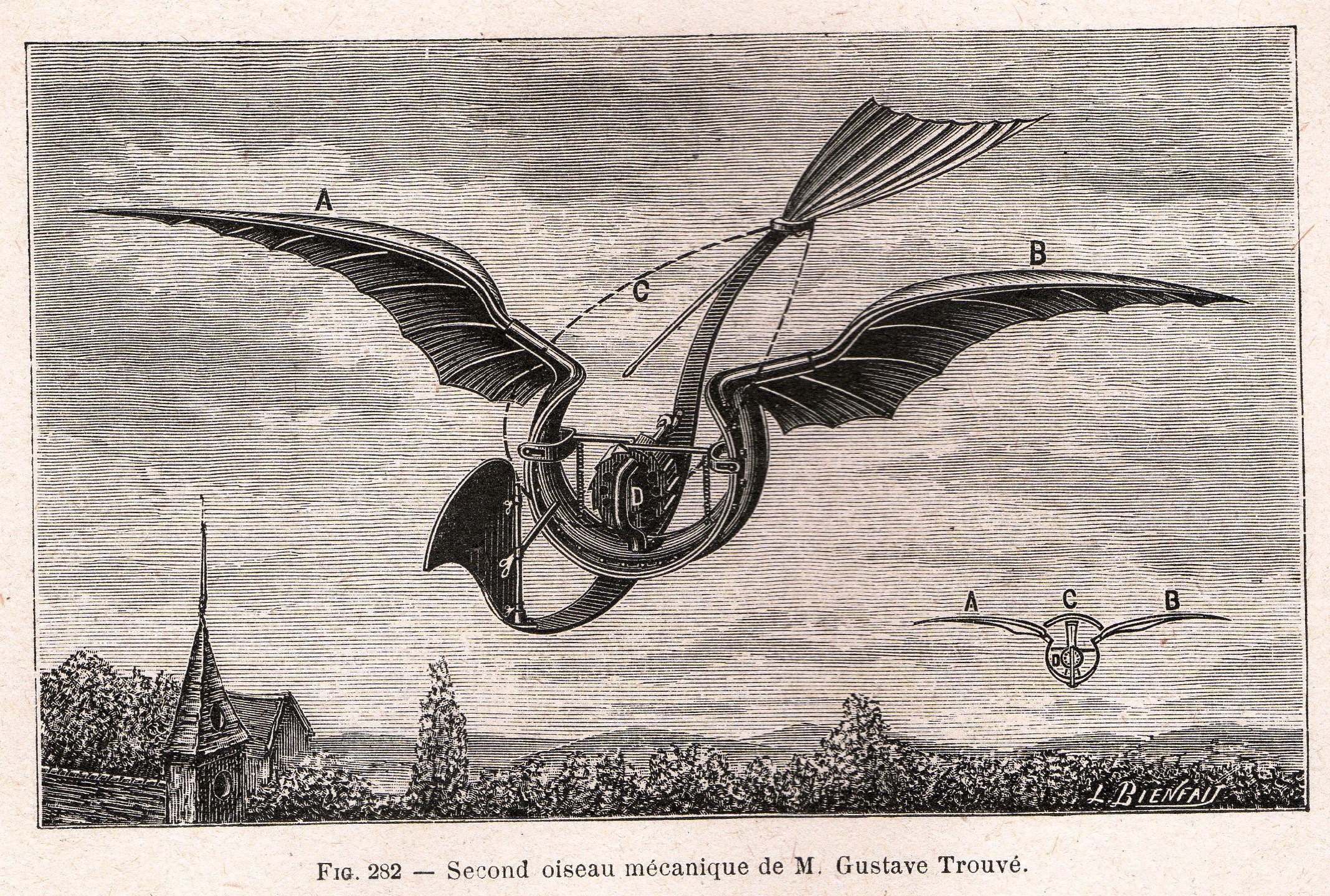
Mechanical bird

- 1864 Electro-spherical Geissler tube motor
- 1865 The Lilliputian sealed battery
- 1865 Electro-medical apparatus
- 1865 Electro-mobile jewelry
- 1865 Electric gyroscope
- 1866 Electric rifle
- 1867 Electro-medical kit
- 1869 Liquid-fuelled pantoscope
- 1870 Device imitating the flight of birds
- 1870 Explorer of bullets
- 1872 Portable Military Telegraph
- 1873 Trouvé-Paquelin electric recliner chair
- 1873 Improved dichromate battery
- 1875 Electric almanac or calendar
- 1875 Portable Dynamo-electric machine
- 1875 Oxygen spacesuit for balloonists
- 1877 Simulation of muscle contraction
- 1877 Electric paperweight
- 1878 Exploratory polyscopes for cavities of the human body
- 1878 Telephones and improvement of the microphone
- 1880 Trouvé-Cros pneumatic postal elevator
- 1880 Improved Siemens motor
- 1881 Manufacture of magnets
- 1881 Luminous electric jewels
- 1881 Electric boat
- 1881 Miniaturized dental drill
- 1881 Marine outboard motor
- 1881 Electric tricycle
- 1883 Underwater lighting.
- 1883 Trouvé-Hélot frontal headlamp
- 1883 Electric vehicle headlamp
- 1884 Electric safety lamp
- 1885 Electrical apparatus for lighting physiology and chemistry laboratories
- 1885 Underwater lighting used during the Suez Canal
- 1886 New system for constructing propellers
- 1886 Electric siren as an alarm signal
- 1887 Working model electric helicopter (tethered)
- 1887 Electric auxanoscope (image projector)
- 1889 Electric counter
- 1889 Dynamo electric demonstrator
- 1889 Improvements to the electric rifle
- 1889 System for transporting plate glass sheets
- 1890 Universal dynamometer
- 1890 Electric lighting for horse-drawn carriages
- 1890 Electric orygmatoscope for the inspection of geological layers.
- 1890 Mobile electric-pneumatic streetlamp lighter
- 1891 Second mechanical bird
- 1891 Improvements in luminous electric fountains
- 1892 Electric trigger mechanism for time-lapse photography
- 1892 Hand-held medical dynamometer
- 1892 Battery-electric massage instrument for hernia
- 1893 Electric industrial ventilation system
- 1894 System for automatic fishing by night.
- 1894 Electric stunning lance for hunting
- 1894 Luminous electric jewelry belt
- 1894 Electric keyboard instrument based on Savart's wheel
- 1894 Luminous electric jumping rope
- 1895 Acetylene domestic lighting
- 1895 Universal AC/DC electric motor
- 1895 Improved pedal bicycle
- 1895 Manual/electric hybrid massaging machine
- 1897 Device for automatic bottling of acetylene
- 1897 Device for hermetically sealing containers of acetylene
- 1897 Windmill toy for hats and canes
- 1898 Multi-task manual-electric industrial gyratory pump
- 1899 Carburetor for internal combustion engines
- 1900 Battery electric inflatable wearable lifejacket
- 1901 Binoculars for the Navy
- 1901 Phototherapy instruments
- 1902 Spring-loaded harpoon gun toy
- 1902 Propulsion of model boat or submarine by acetylene
