= Sound card mixer =

A sound card mixer is the analog part of a sound card that routes and mixes sound signals. This circuit receives inputs from both external connectors and the sound card's digital-to-analog converters. It selects or mutes, amplifies (with variable gain) these signals, adds them together, and finally routes the result to both external output connectors and the sound card's analog-to-digital converters. Different mixing schemes are in use, but the ones implemented in most IBM-PC compatible computers today are variants of a scheme defined in Intel's AC'97 Audio Component Specification.

== Features ==
Features of sound card mixer includeds:

- Audio channel remap
- Audio volume control
- Mixing multiple PCM audio streams
  - Sample rate conversion
  - Audio bit depth conversion

== Mixer controls ==
Sound card mixer controls are provided through the GUI interface in the computer's operating system. On most desktop environments, the mixer can be accessed via a Volume icon in the system tray.

Mixer controls are similar to that of a mixing console. They consist of volume sliders or rotary controls that represent each individual source, which may be accompanied by balance and mute controls. Most interfaces provide a method of switching between playback (output) sources and recording (input) sources. Additional hardware or software may add other effects such as low-pass filters, distortion and boost controls.

== Mixing scheme ==
The following schematic shows a greatly simplified example of how some sound card's mixers manipulate sound from different sources:

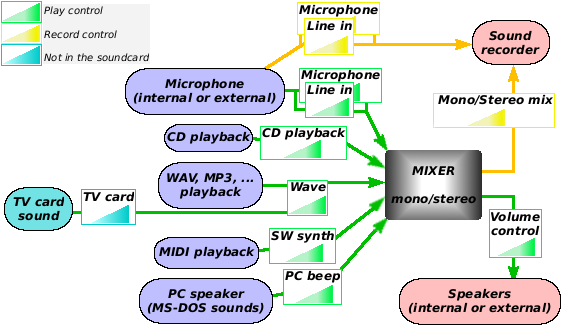

A more accurate depiction of the mixing scheme used in AC'97 compatible sound cards can be seen in Figure 17 of the AC'97 spec.

For integrated sound cards (such as AC'97 or HD Audio based) or integrated sound chips (such as SoundWire based), the software based mixer (such as KMixer, WASAPI or Core Audio) is usually used.

== Typical input channels and controls ==
Each of the following signal sources has its own gain and mute control in a typical mixer scheme:

Control	channels	Controlled source
Wave / PCM	stereo	Audio signal generated by the CPU via the sound card's digital-to-analog converter. (This includes audio produced by games, MP3 or WAV players, but also some software playing a CD-DA through the CPU, such as, Windows Media Player or Media Player Classic, as well as TV tuner cards that use the CPU for decoding audio.)
MIDI/SW Synth	stereo	Audio signal generated by a synthesizer chip (often described as “MIDI device”) or digital signal processor on the sound card.
CD playback	stereo	Audio signal received from the analog CD input of the mixer, which is usually connected to the analog audio output of a CD drive.
Microphone	mono	Audio signal received through one of the (typically two: MIC1 and MIC2, switchable) analog microphone inputs. MIC1 is typically connected to the external microphone jack (colored pink under PC99). An optional 20 decibel (10× voltage) amplifier can be activated for this input in most mixers.
Line in	stereo	Audio signal received through the LINE input of the mixer, usually connected to an external jack (colored light blue in PC99), which can be used to connect a HiFi amplifier, tuner, iPod, television, etc.
Aux in	stereo	Audio signal received through the AUX input of the mixer. This mixer input is not used by all PCs.
PC speaker	mono	Some sound cards provide an input for the (very crude) audio signal that the Programmable Interval Timer of an IBM PC generates for the PC speaker.
SPDIF	stereo	Digital interface, uncommon in the PC world

== Typical output channels and controls ==
Each of the following signal destinations has its own gain and mute control in a typical mixer scheme:

Control	channels	Controlled source
Line out	stereo	Audio signal provided to the LINE OUT jack of a sound card (colored lime green in PC99). This can be connected to headphones or a HiFi amplifier, etc.
Aux out	stereo	Audio signal provided to the AUX OUT connection of the mixer. Not all sound cards provide this mixer channel on an external connector.
Mono out / PC speaker	mono	Audio signal provided to the MONO connection of the mixer. Some PCs connect this signal to an internal PC speaker.
SPDIF	7.1	Digital interface

== Typical record controls ==
In a typical AC’97 style mixer scheme, the analog-to-digital converters that allow the CPU to receive audio signal can either be connected directly to one of each of the inputs, or they can be connected to the same summation result that the mixer can provide via the line, aux and mono analog outputs. Therefore, in addition to the above input and output gain controls, a mixer also provides a number of controls for selecting the recording source. The result of this selection is again subject to a mute and gain control before it is digitized.
