= Octave band =

Frequency band that spans one octave

An octave band is a frequency band that spans one octave. In this context an octave can be a factor of 2 or a factor of 10^{0.3}. To remove the ambiguity, an alternative name suggested for a factor of 10^{0.3} is "dectave", a portmanteau of "decimal" and "octave". An octave of 1200 cents in musical pitch (a logarithmic unit) corresponds to a frequency ratio of 2/ 1 ≈ 10^{0.301} .

An international standard set of octave bands and one-third octave bands (Note: Strictlyspeaking, dectave bands and one decidecade bands) has been developed for frequency analysis in acoustics. A band is said to be an octave in width when the upper band frequency is approximately twice the lower band frequency.

== Frequency bands ==
A whole frequency range can be divided into sets of frequencies called bands, with each band covering a specific range of frequencies. For example, radio frequencies are divided into multiple levels of band divisions and subdivisions, and rather than octaves, the highest level of radio bands (VLF, LF, MF, HF, VHF, etc.) are divided up by the wavelengths' power of ten (decads, or decils) that is the same for all radio waves in the same band, rather than the power of two, as in analysis of acoustical frequencies.

In acoustical analysis, a one-third octave band is defined as a frequency band whose upper band-edge frequency ( f_{2} or f_{max} ) is the lower band frequency ( f_{1} or f_{min} ) times the tenth root of ten, or 1.2589 : The first of the one-third octave bands ends at a frequency 25.9% higher than the starting frequency for all of them, the base frequency, or approximately 399 musical cents above the start (the same frequency ratio as the musical interval between the notes c–e. The second one-third octave begins where the first-third ends and itself ends at a frequency 1.2589 ² = 1.5849 × , or 58.5% higher than the original starting frequency. The third-third, or last band ends at 1.2589 ³ = 1.9953 × , or 199.5% of the base frequency.

Any useful subdivision of acoustic frequencies is possible: Fractional octave bands such as 1 / 3 or 1/ 12 of an octave (the spacing of musical notes in 12 tone equal temperament) are widely used in acoustical engineering.

Analyzing a source on a frequency by frequency basis is possible, most often using Fourier transform analysis.

== Octave bands ==
=== Calculation ===
If $\ f_\mathsf{c}\$ is the center frequency of an octave band, one can compute the octave band boundaries as

$$\ f_c = \sqrt{2} f_\mathsf{min} = \frac{\ f_\mathsf{max}\ }{\ \sqrt{2\ }\ }\ ,$$

where $\ f_\mathsf{min}\$ is the lower frequency boundary and $\ f_\mathsf{max}\$ the upper one.

=== Naming ===
| Band number | Nominal frequency | Calculated frequency | A-weight adjustment |
|---|---|---|---|
| −1 | 16 Hz | 15.625 Hz | |
| 0 | 31.5 Hz | 31.250 Hz | −39.4 dB |
| 1 | 63 Hz | 62.500 Hz | −26.2 dB |
| 2 | 125 Hz | 125.000 Hz | −16.1 dB |
| 3 | 250 Hz | 250.000 Hz | −8.6 dB |
| 4 | 500 Hz | 500.000 Hz | −3.2 dB |
| 5 | 1 kHz | 1000.000 Hz | 0 dB |
| 6 | 2 kHz | 2000.000 Hz | +1.2 dB |
| 7 | 4 kHz | 4000.000 Hz | +1.0 dB |
| 8 | 8 kHz | 8000.000 Hz | −1.1 dB |
| 9 | 16 kHz | 16000.000 Hz | −6.6 dB |

Note that 1000.000 Hz, in octave 5, is the nominal central or reference frequency, and as such gets no correction.

== One-third octave bands ==
=== Base 2 calculation ===
%% Calculate Third Octave Bands (base 2) in Matlab
fcentre  = 10^3 * (2 .^ ([-18:13]/3))
fd = 2^(1/6);
fupper = fcentre * fd
flower = fcentre / fd

=== Base 10 calculation ===
%% Calculate Third Octave Bands (base 10) in Matlab
fcentre = 10.^(0.1.*[12:43])
fd = 10^(1/20);
fupper = fcentre * fd
flower = fcentre / fd

=== Naming ===
Due to slight rounding differences between the base two and base ten formulas, the exact starting and ending frequencies for various subdivisions of the octave come out slightly differently.

| Band number | Nominal frequency | Base 2 calculated frequency | Base 10 calculated frequency |
|---|---|---|---|
| 1 | 16 Hz | 15.625 Hz | 15.849 Hz |
| 2 | 20 Hz | 19.686 Hz | 19.953 Hz |
| 3 | 25 Hz | 24.803 Hz | 25.119 Hz |
| 4 | 31.5 Hz | 31.250 Hz | 31.623 Hz |
| 5 | 40 Hz | 39.373 Hz | 39.811 Hz |
| 6 | 50 Hz | 49.606 Hz | 50.119 Hz |
| 7 | 63 Hz | 62.500 Hz | 63.096 Hz |
| 8 | 80 Hz | 78.745 Hz | 79.433 Hz |
| 9 | 100 Hz | 99.213 Hz | 100 Hz |
| 10 | 125 Hz | 125.000 Hz | 125.89 Hz |
| 11 | 160 Hz | 157.490 Hz | 158.49 Hz |
| 12 | 200 Hz | 198.425 Hz | 199.53 Hz |
| 13 | 250 Hz | 250.000 Hz | 251.19 Hz |
| 14 | 315 Hz | 314.980 Hz | 316.23 Hz |
| 15 | 400 Hz | 396.850 Hz | 398.11 Hz |
| 16 | 500 Hz | 500.000 Hz | 501.19 Hz |
| 17 | 630 Hz | 629.961 Hz | 630.96 Hz |
| 18 | 800 Hz | 793.701 Hz | 794.43 Hz |
| 19 | 1 kHz | 1000.000 Hz | 1000 Hz |
| 20 | 1.25 kHz | 1259.921 Hz | 1258.9 Hz |
| 21 | 1.6 kHz | 1587.401 Hz | 1584.9 Hz |
| 22 | 2 kHz | 2000.000 Hz | 1995.3 Hz |
| 23 | 2.5 kHz | 2519.842 Hz | 2511.9 Hz |
| 24 | 3.150 kHz | 3174.802 Hz | 3162.3 Hz |
| 25 | 4 kHz | 4000.000 Hz | 3981.1 Hz |
| 26 | 5 kHz | 5039.684 Hz | 5011.9 Hz |
| 27 | 6.3 kHz | 6349.604 Hz | 6309.6 Hz |
| 28 | 8 kHz | 8000.000 Hz | 7943.3 Hz |
| 29 | 10 kHz | 10079.368 Hz | 10 kHz |
| 30 | 12.5 kHz | 12699.208 Hz | 12.589 kHz |
| 31 | 16 kHz | 16000.000 Hz | 15.849 kHz |
| 32 | 20 kHz | 20158.737 Hz | 19.953 kHz |

== See also ==
- octave
- octave (electronics)
