= Decade (log scale) =

Unit for measuring ratios on a logarithmic scale

Four powers of 10 spanning a range of three decades: 1, 10, 100, 1000 (10^{0}, 10^{1}, 10^{2}, 10^{3})

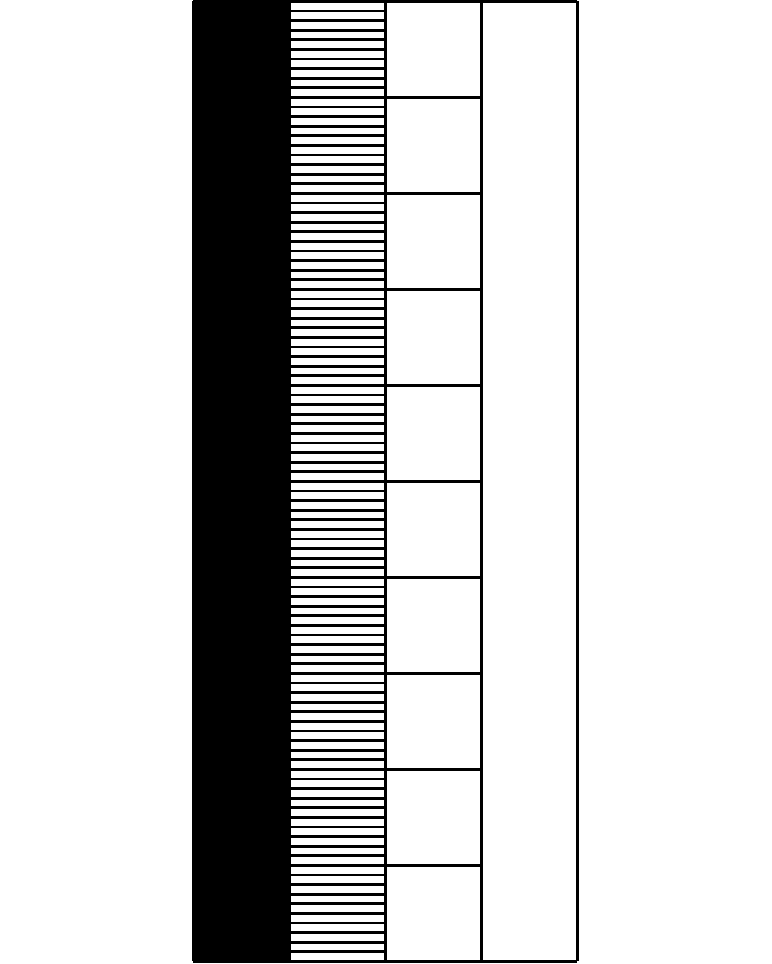
Four grids spanning three decades of resolution: 0.001, 0.01, 0.1, 1.

One decade (symbol dec) is a unit for measuring ratios on a logarithmic scale, with one decade corresponding to a ratio of 10 between two numbers.

== Example: Scientific notation ==
When a real number like 0.007 is denoted by 7.0×10^{−3}, it is said that the number is represented in scientific notation. More generally, to write a number in the form a × 10^{b}, where 1 ≤ a < 10 and b is an integer, is to express it in scientific notation, and a is called the significand or the mantissa, and b is its exponent. The numbers so expressible with an exponent equal to b span a single decade, from 10^{b} to 10^{b+1}.

== Frequency measurement ==
Decades are especially useful when describing frequency response of electronic systems, such as audio amplifiers and filters.

=== Calculations ===
The factor-of-ten in a decade can be in either direction: so one decade up from 100 Hz is 1000 Hz, and one decade down is 10 Hz. The factor-of-ten is what is important, not the unit used, so 3.14 rad/s is one decade down from 31.4 rad/s.

To determine the number of decades between two frequencies (f_{1} and f_{2}), use the logarithm of the ratio of the two values:

- log_{10}(f_{2}/f_{1}) dec

or, using natural logarithms:

- [(ln f_{2} − ln f_{1}) / ln 10] dec

How many decades is it from 15 rad/s to 150000 rad/s?

log_{10}(150000/15) = 4 dec

How many decades is it from 3.2 GHz to 4.7 MHz?

log_{10}(4.7×10^{6} / 3.2×10^{9}) = −2.83 dec

How many decades is one octave?

One octave is a factor of 2, so log_{10}(2) = 0.301 decades per octave (decade = just major twenty-fourth = three octaves plus a just major third, 10/1 = 5/4)

To find out what frequency is a certain number of decades from the original frequency, multiply by appropriate powers of 10:

What is 3 decades down from 220 Hz?

220×10^{−3} Hz = 0.22 Hz

What is 1.5 decades up from 10 Hz?

10×10^{1.5} ≈ 316.23 Hz

To find out the size of a step for a certain number of frequencies per decade, raise 10 to the power of the inverse of the number of steps:

What is the step size for 30 steps per decade?

10^{1/30} ≈ 1.079775 – or each step is 7.9775% larger than the last.

=== Graphical representation and analysis ===

Decades on a logarithmic scale, rather than unit steps (steps of 1) or other linear scale, are commonly used on the horizontal axis when representing the frequency response of electronic circuits in graphical form, such as in Bode plots, since depicting large frequency ranges on a linear scale is often not practical. For example, an audio amplifier will usually have a frequency band ranging from 20 Hz to 20 kHz and representing the entire band using a decade log scale is very convenient. Typically the graph for such a representation would begin at 1 Hz (10^{0} Hz) and go up to perhaps 100 kHz (10^{5} Hz), to comfortably include the full audio band in a standard-sized graph paper, as shown below. Whereas in the same distance on a linear scale, with 10 as the major step-size, you might only get from 0 to 50.

Bode plot showing the concept of a decade: each major division on the horizontal axis is one decade

Electronic frequency responses are often described in terms of "per decade". The example Bode plot shows a slope of −20 dB/dec in the stopband, which means that for every factor-of-ten increase in frequency (going from 10 rad/s to 100 rad/s in the figure), the gain decreases by 20 dB.

=== Fractions of a decade ===
Decades are sometimes subdivided into fractions of 1/10, 1/100 or 1/1000 of a decade. These subdivisions are referred to as decidecade, centidecade and millidecade, respectively. A millidecade is also known as a savart.

== See also ==
- Cosmic View: The Universe in 40 Jumps
- Dectave
- Frequency level
- Octave
- One-third octave
- Order of magnitude
- Slide rule
