= Johann Scheibler =

Prussian musicologist and silk manufacturer

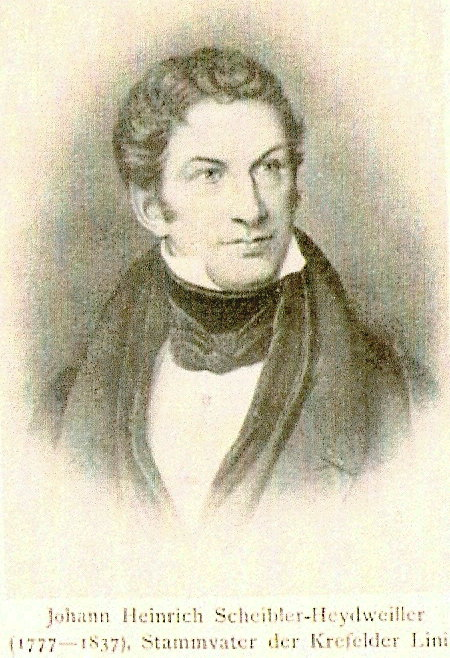
Johann Heinrich Scheibler

Johann Heinrich Scheibler (11 November 1777 – 20 January 1837) was a silk manufacturer from Crefeld, Prussia, without a scientific background, who went on to make contributions to the science of acoustics as a self taught musicologist. He made a "tonometer" (German: Tonmesser) from 56 tuning forks as an instrument for accurately measuring pitch by counting beating, described in 1834. "A wooden board...together with a small wooden mallet with which the forks are to be struck, and a good metronome, constitute Scheibler's tuning apparatus."

'The physical and musical Tonometer, which makes evident to the eye, by means of the pendulum [metronome], the absolute vibrations of the tones, and of the principal kinds of combinational tones, as well as the most precise exactness of equally tempered and mathematical chords, invented and executed by Heinrich Scheibler, silk manufacturer in Crefeld.'

— Sensations of Tone (1885)

If the frequency of a tuning fork is known, then a higher fork's frequency may be determined by using a metronome to determine the frequency of the beating: F1+beating=F2. Joseph Sauveur (1653–1716) used this method to determine the relative frequencies of organ pipes and improve the earlier calculations of Marin Mersenne based on Mersenne's laws.

In the experimental period at the end of the 18th and beginning of the 19th century there were very virtuoso instrumentalists on the mouth harp. Thus, for example, [in 1816] Johann Heinrich Scheibler was able to mount up to ten mouth harps on a support disc. He called the instrument "Aura". Each mouth harp was tuned to different basic tones, which made even chromatic sequences possible.

— Walter Maurer, translated from German

His writings include:

- Der physikalische und musikalische Tonmesser, welcher… [The Physical and Musical Tonometer]; G. D. Bädeker, Essen, 1834.
- Ueber mathematische Stimmung, Temperaturen und Orgelstimmung nach Vibrations-Differenzen oder Stößen [On the mathematics of tuning: temperature and organ-tuning after alterations of vibration], Krefeld, 1837.

== See also ==
- Savart wheel
- Stuttgart pitch
