= Neper =

Logarithmic unit for ratios of measurements of physical field and power quantities

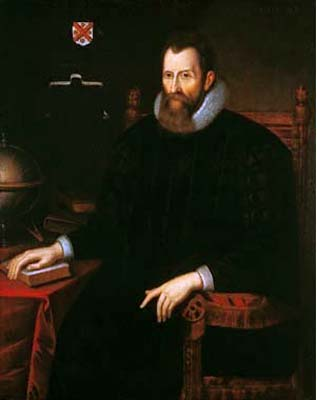
John Napier after whom the unit is named

The neper (symbol: Np) is a logarithmic unit for ratios of measurements of physical field and power quantities, such as gain and loss of electronic signals. The unit's name derives from the name of John Napier, the inventor of logarithms. As is the case for the decibel and bel, the neper is a unit defined in the international standard ISO 80000. It is not part of the International System of Units (SI).

== Definition ==
Like the decibel, the neper is a unit in a logarithmic scale. While the bel uses the decadic (base-10) logarithm to compute ratios, the neper uses the natural logarithm, based on Euler's number (e ≈ 2.71828). The level of a ratio of two signal amplitudes or root-power quantities, with the unit neper, is given by

$$L = \ln\frac{x_1}{x_2}\mathrm{~Np},$$

where $x_1$ and $x_2$ are the signal amplitudes, and ln is the natural logarithm. The level of a ratio of two power quantities, with the unit neper, is given by

$$L = \frac{1}{2} \ln\frac{p_1}{p_2}\mathrm{~Np},$$

where $p_1$ and $p_2$ are the signal powers.

In the International System of Quantities, the neper is defined as 1 Np = 1.

== Units ==
The neper is defined in terms of ratios of field quantities—also called root-power quantities—(for example, voltage or current amplitudes in electrical circuits, or pressure in acoustics), whereas the decibel was originally defined in terms of power ratios. A power ratio 10 log r dB is equivalent to a field-quantity ratio 20 log r dB, since power in a linear system is proportional to the square (Joule's laws) of the amplitude. Hence the decibel and the neper have a fixed ratio to each other:

$$1\ \text{Np} = 20 \log_{10} e\ \text{dB} \approx \text{8.685889638 dB}$$

and

$$1\ \mathrm{dB} = \frac{1}{20} \ln(10)\ \mathrm{Np} \approx \text{0.115129255 Np} .$$

The (voltage) level ratio is

$$\begin{align}
L & = 10 \log_{10} \frac{x_1^2}{x_2^2} & \text{dB} \\
& = 10 \log_{10} {\left(\frac{x_1}{x_2}\right)}^2 & \text{dB} \\
& = 20 \log_{10} \frac{x_1}{x_2} & \text{dB} \\
& = \ln \frac{x_1}{x_2} & \text{Np}. \\
\end{align}$$

Like the decibel, the neper is a dimensionless unit. The International Telecommunication Union (ITU) recognizes both units. Only the neper is coherent with the SI.

== Applications ==
The neper is a natural linear unit of relative difference, meaning in nepers (logarithmic units) relative differences add rather than multiply. This property is shared with logarithmic units in other bases, such as the bel.

The derived units decineper (1 dNp = 0.1 neper) and centineper (1 cNp = 0.01 neper) are also used. The centineper for root-power quantities corresponds to a log point or log percentage, see Relative change and difference § Logarithmic scale.

== See also ==
- Nat (unit)
- Nepers per metre

== Works ==
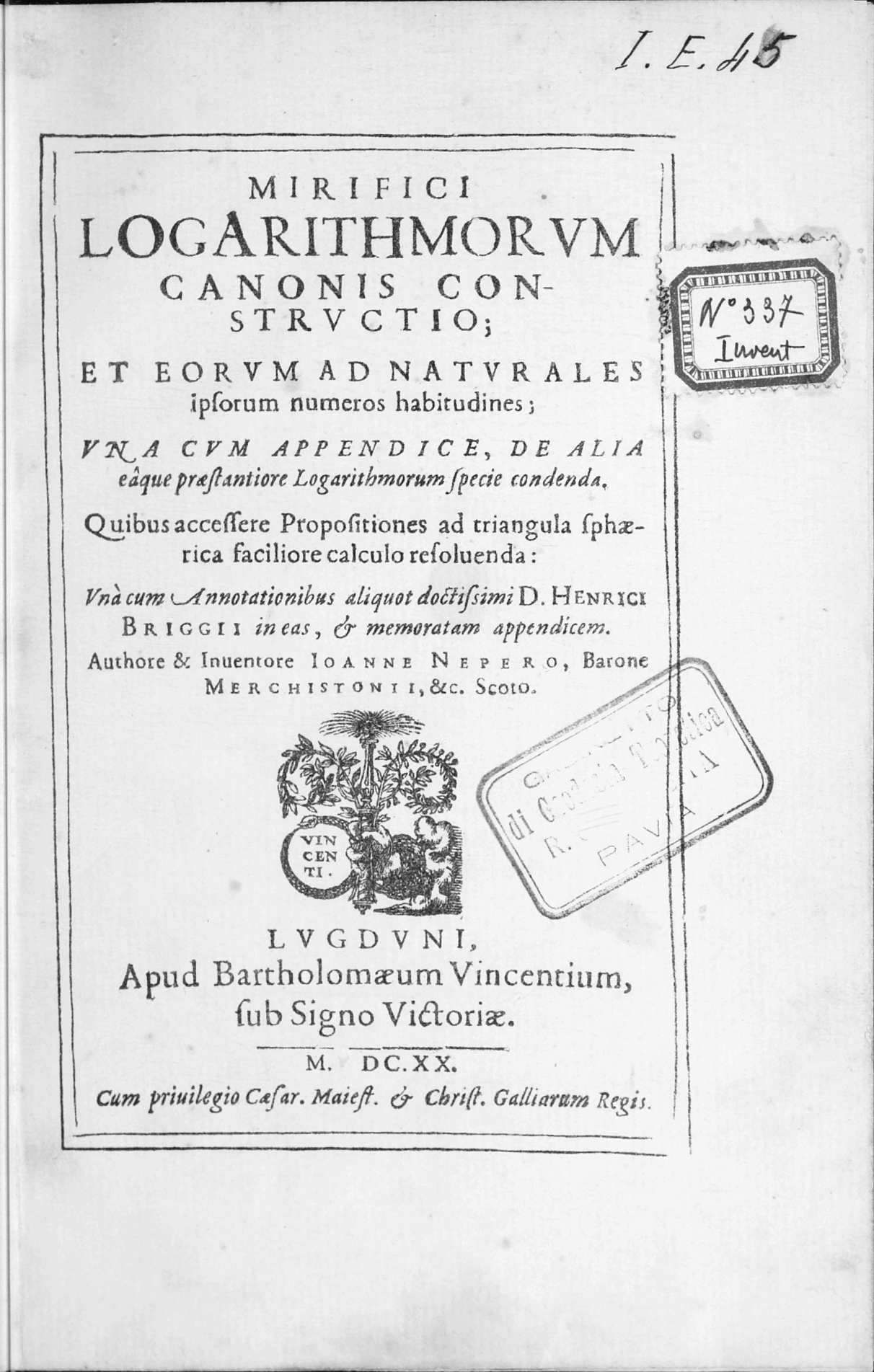
Mirifici logarithmorum canonis constructio, 1825

- Mirifici logarithmorum canonis constructio (in French). Paris: Librairie scientifique Hermann et C.ie. 1825.
