= Sikorsky Firefly =

All-electric helicopter built for research purposes

Firefly
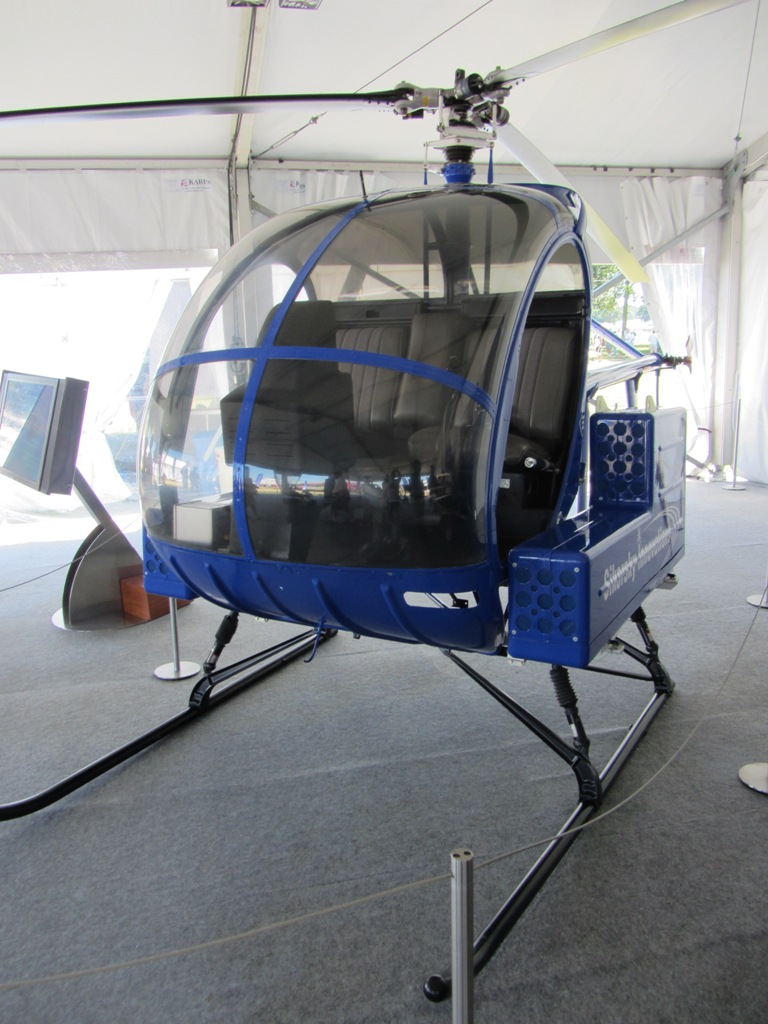
- Sikorsky Firefly

General information
- Type: Light Experimental electric helicopter
- Manufacturer: Sikorsky Aircraft
- Status: Defunct

History
- Developed from: Sikorsky S-300

The Sikorsky Firefly is an all-electric helicopter built for research purposes by Sikorsky Aircraft. It has been called the world's "first all-electric helicopter". The Firefly is a modified Sikorsky S-300C helicopter with its engine replaced by an electric motor and two lithium-ion battery packs. The helicopter would hold only the pilot and no passengers. Sikorsky reported an operating time of 12 to 15 minutes and a top speed of 80 kn (150 km/h; 92 mph).

It was expected that the helicopter would make its first flight in late 2010 or early 2011. For undisclosed reasons, the helicopter was never flown and the project is now defunct.

== History ==
Sikorsky announced the aircraft at the Farnborough International Air Show in the United Kingdom on July 19, 2010, and displayed it for the first time at the Experimental Aircraft Association's AirVenture 2010 convention in Oshkosh, Wisconsin, on July 26. Upon the Firefly's announcement, Sikorsky revealed that they had been working on the project for over two years. The cost of the project was never disclosed.

== Development ==
The Firefly was created by replacing the engine of the S-300C light helicopter, which began production in 1964 as the Hughes 300. The S-300C's Lycoming 190 hp (140 kW), 5.9-liter, 4-cylinder gasoline engine was replaced with an electric motor, a new motor mount, and two battery packs located on each side of the pilot. The rotor control, transmission and other systems were left essentially unchanged. The project was inspired by observing electric drag cars.

Sikorsky Innovations director Chris Van Buiten stated that the development of the Firefly was intended to demonstrate the technology required for vertical electric flight.

== Electric motor and battery ==
The high-efficiency electric motor is powered by two 45Ah lithium-ion battery packs, each of which weighs 585 pounds (265 kg). The battery packs, manufactured by Gaia Power Technologies, have a total of 300 cells and produce about 370 volts. The electric motor is expected to fly with much less noise, emissions and vibration and require shorter maintenance periods over the life of the aircraft. The electric motor and controller system weighs 180 lb (82 kg). Empty weight is close to the 2,050-pound (930 kg) MTOW. The batteries, motor and electronic components are air cooled, and the batteries have 15 minute endurance.

If the aircraft completely loses power, it can auto-rotate for a safe landing. The pilot would have plenty of warning if the batteries ran down during flight.

Eagle Aviation Technologies, LLC, installed the new permanent-magnet electric motor and digital controller from U.S. Hybrid, and the batteries.

== See also ==
- AgustaWestland Project Zero
- Hughes TH-55 Osage
- Solution F/Chretien Helicopter
