= One-third octave =

Logarithmic unit of frequency ratio, equalling 400 cents

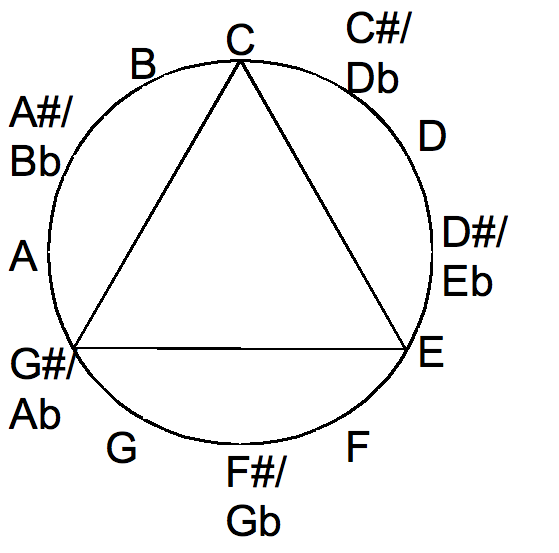
Augmented chord in the chromatic circle

A one-third octave is a logarithmic unit of frequency ratio equal to either one third of an octave (1200/3 = 400 cents: major third) or one tenth of a decade (3986.31/10 = 398.631 cents: M3). An alternative (unambiguous) term for one tenth of a decade is a decidecade.

== Definitions ==
=== Base 2 ===
ISO 18405:2017 defines a "one-third octave" (or "one-third octave (base 2)") as one third of an octave, corresponding to a frequency ratio of $2^{1/3}$. A one-third octave (base 2) is precisely 400 cents.

=== Base 10 ===
IEC 61260-1:2014 and ANSI S1.6-2016 define a "one-third octave" as one tenth of a decade, corresponding to a frequency ratio of $10^{1/10}$. This unit is referred to by ISO 18405 as a "decidecade" or "one-third octave (base 10)".

One decidecade is equal to 100 savarts (approximately 398.631 cents).

== See also ==
- Decibel
- Octave band
- Pseudo-octave
- Tritonic scale
