= Schweizer S300 =

Helicopter model

Hughes/Schweizer 300 series S-300/S300C
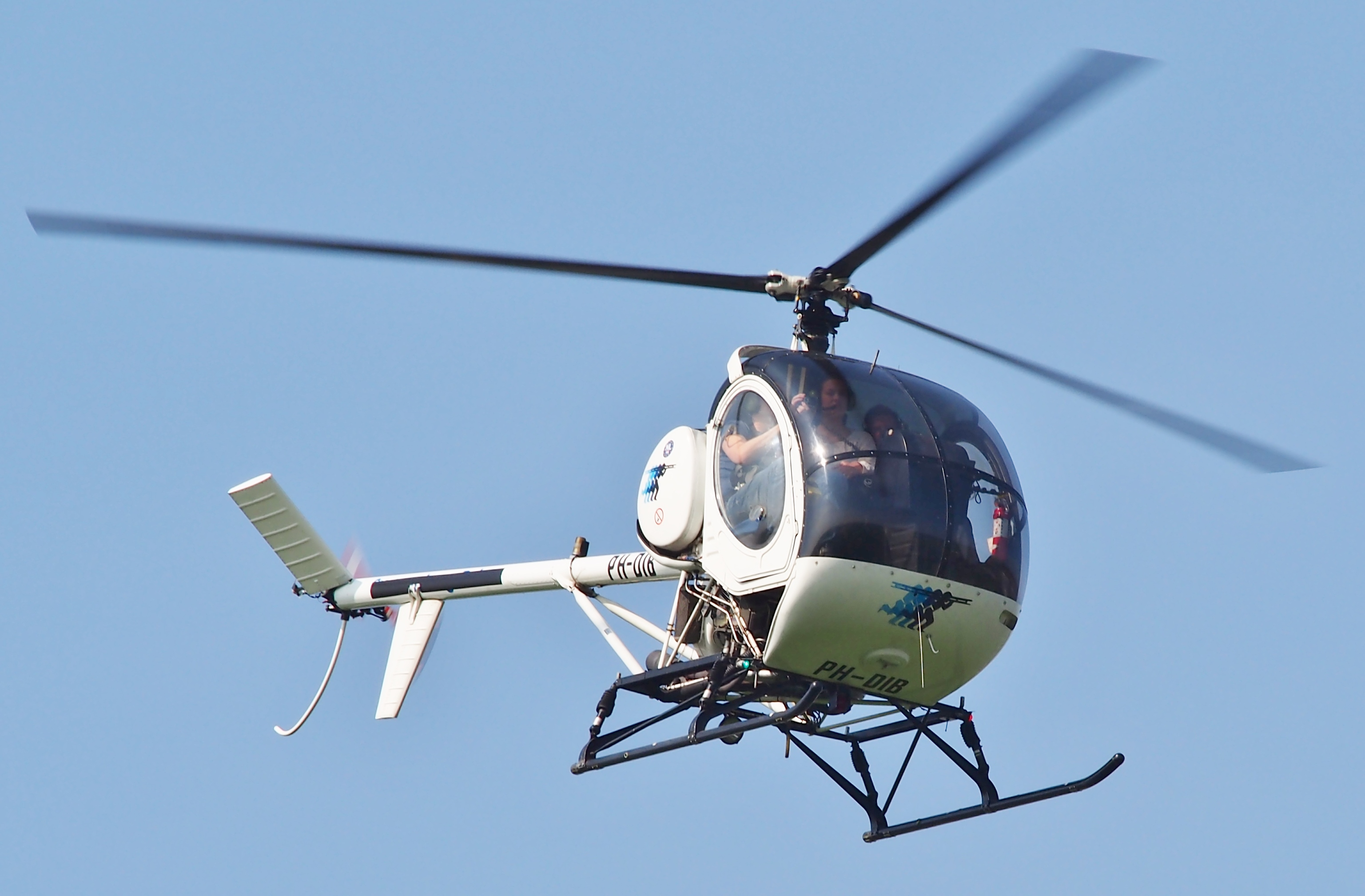
- A Schweizer 300C over Hilversum Airport

General information
- Type: Light utility and trainer helicopter
- Manufacturer: Hughes Helicopters; Schweizer Aircraft Corporation; Sikorsky Aircraft; Schweizer RSG
- Status: In production
- Number built: 2,800 (Hughes)

History
- Manufactured: 1964–1983 (Hughes)
- Introduction date: 1964
- First flight: 2 October 1956 (Hughes 269)
- Developed from: Hughes TH-55 Osage
- Developed into: Schweizer 330/333; Sikorsky Firefly

The Schweizer S300 series (formerly the Hughes 300, Schweizer 300, and Sikorsky S-300 series) is a family of light utility helicopters originally produced by Hughes Helicopters, as a development of the Hughes 269. Later manufactured by Schweizer Aircraft, and currently produced by Schweizer RSG, the basic design has been in production for over 60 years. The piston-powered S300 series features single three-bladed rotors; these helicopters tend to be used as a cost-effective platform for training and agriculture.

== Development ==
=== Background ===
In 1955, Hughes Tool Company's Aircraft Division (later Hughes Helicopters) carried out a market survey showing that there was a demand for a low-cost, lightweight, two-seat helicopter. The division began building the Model 269 in September 1955. The prototype flew on 2 October 1956, but it was not until 1960 that the decision was made to develop the helicopter for production.

On 9 April 1959, the 269 received certification from the Federal Aviation Administration (FAA) and Hughes continued to concentrate on civil production. With some design changes, deliveries of the Model 269A version began in 1961. By mid-1963 about 20 aircraft were being produced per month, and by the spring of 1964 314 had been built. Hughes had successfully captured a large portion of the civilian helicopter market with an aircraft that would prove popular in agriculture, police work and other duties.

=== Model 300 ===
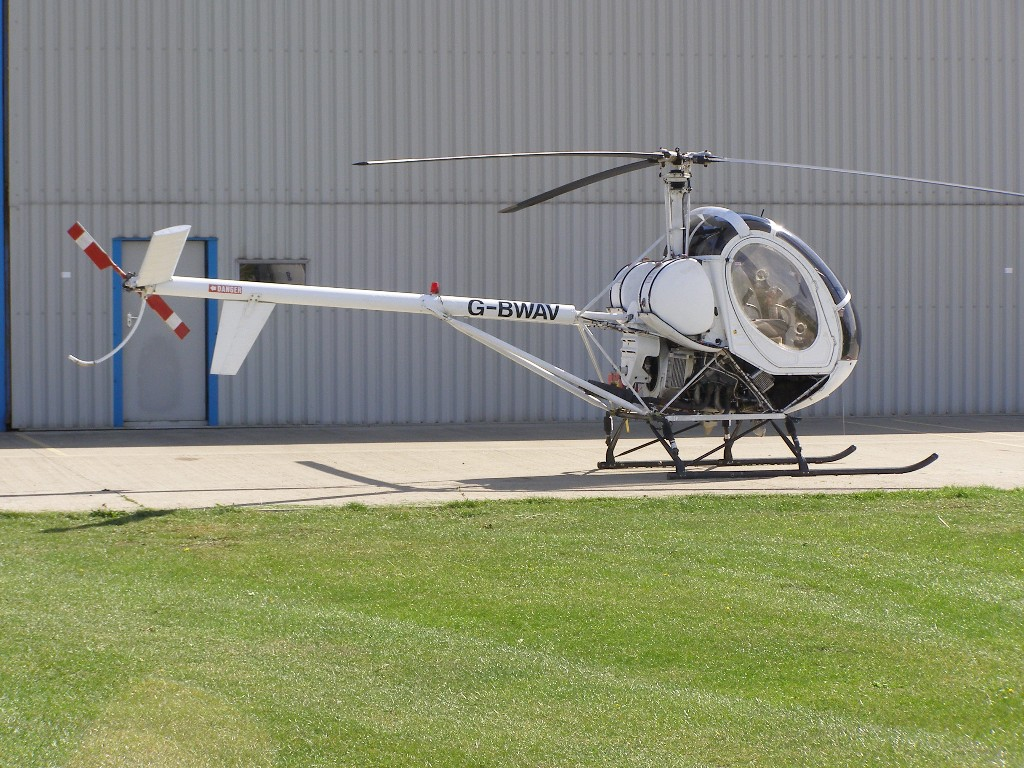
Schweizer 300C

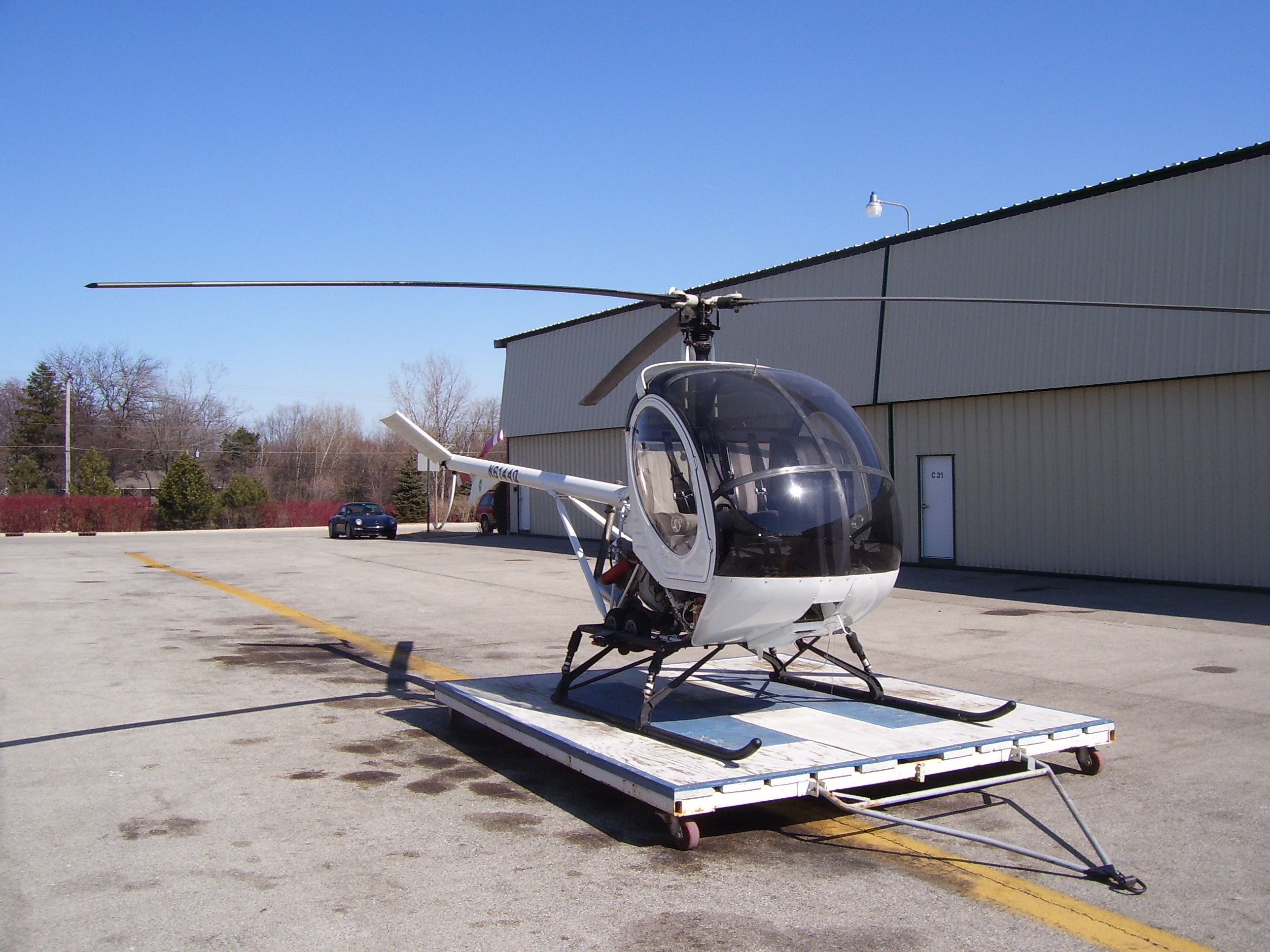
Schweizer 300CB on hangar dolly

In 1964, Hughes introduced the slightly larger three-seat Model 269B which it marketed as the Hughes 300. That same year, the Hughes 269 set an endurance record of 101 hours. To set the record, two pilots took turns piloting the aircraft and hovered in ground-effect for fueling. To ensure no cheating, eggs were attached to the bottom of the skid gear to register any record-ending landing.

The Hughes 300 was followed in 1969 by the improved Hughes 300C (sometimes Hughes 269C), which first flew on 6 March 1969 and received FAA certification in May 1970. This new model introduced a more powerful 190 hp (140 kW) Lycoming HIO-360-D1A engine and increased rotor diameter, giving a payload increase of 45%, plus overall performance improvements. It was this model that Schweizer began building under license from Hughes in 1983.

In 1986, Schweizer acquired all rights to the helicopter from McDonnell Douglas, which had purchased Hughes Helicopters in 1984. After Schweizer acquired the FAA Type Certificate, the helicopter was known for a short time as the Schweizer-Hughes 300C and then simply, the Schweizer 300C. The basic design remained unchanged over the years, despite Schweizer making over 250 minor improvements.

Schweizer was purchased on August 26, 2004, by Sikorsky Aircraft. The Schweizer 300 models fill a gap in the Sikorsky helicopter line, which is known for its medium and heavy utility and cargo helicopters.

In February 2009, the 300C was rebranded as the Sikorsky S-300C.

In 2018 the type certificate for the 269/300 product line was sold by Sikorsky to Schweizer RSG in Fort Worth Texas. The new company, affiliated with Rotorcraft Services Group, will support the existing fleet and will start to build new aircraft at Meacham Airport in Fort Worth, Texas. The management team includes industry and product veterans such as David Horton and Mike Iven.

=== Derivatives ===
Between Hughes and Schweizer, and including foreign-licensed production civil and military training aircraft, nearly 3,000 units of the Model 269/300 have been built and flown over the last 50 years. Schweizer continued to develop the Model 300 by adding a turbine and redesigning the body to create the Schweizer 330. Further developing the dynamic components to take greater advantage of the power of the turbine engine led to the development of the Schweizer S-333.

In recent years the cockpit received an upgrade when an STC was developed for the installation of the Garmin G500H helicopter dual-screen electronic flight display, as well as the Mid-Continent MD302 Standby Attitude Indicator.

== Design ==
The Hughes 269 was created with a fully articulated three-bladed main rotor wherein the blades advance to the right and a two-bladed tail rotor that would remain as distinctive characteristics of all its variants. It also has shock absorber-damped, skid-type landing gear. The flight controls are directly linked to the control surfaces of the helicopter so there are no hydraulics in the 269. There are generally two sets of controls, although this was optional on the civil 269A. For three-seat aircraft, the middle collective control stick is removable and a seat cushion can be put in its place for the third passenger. In the 300CB and 300CBi, the collective control can be repositioned to left-handed configuration for the Pilot In Command position (right seat).

== Variants ==
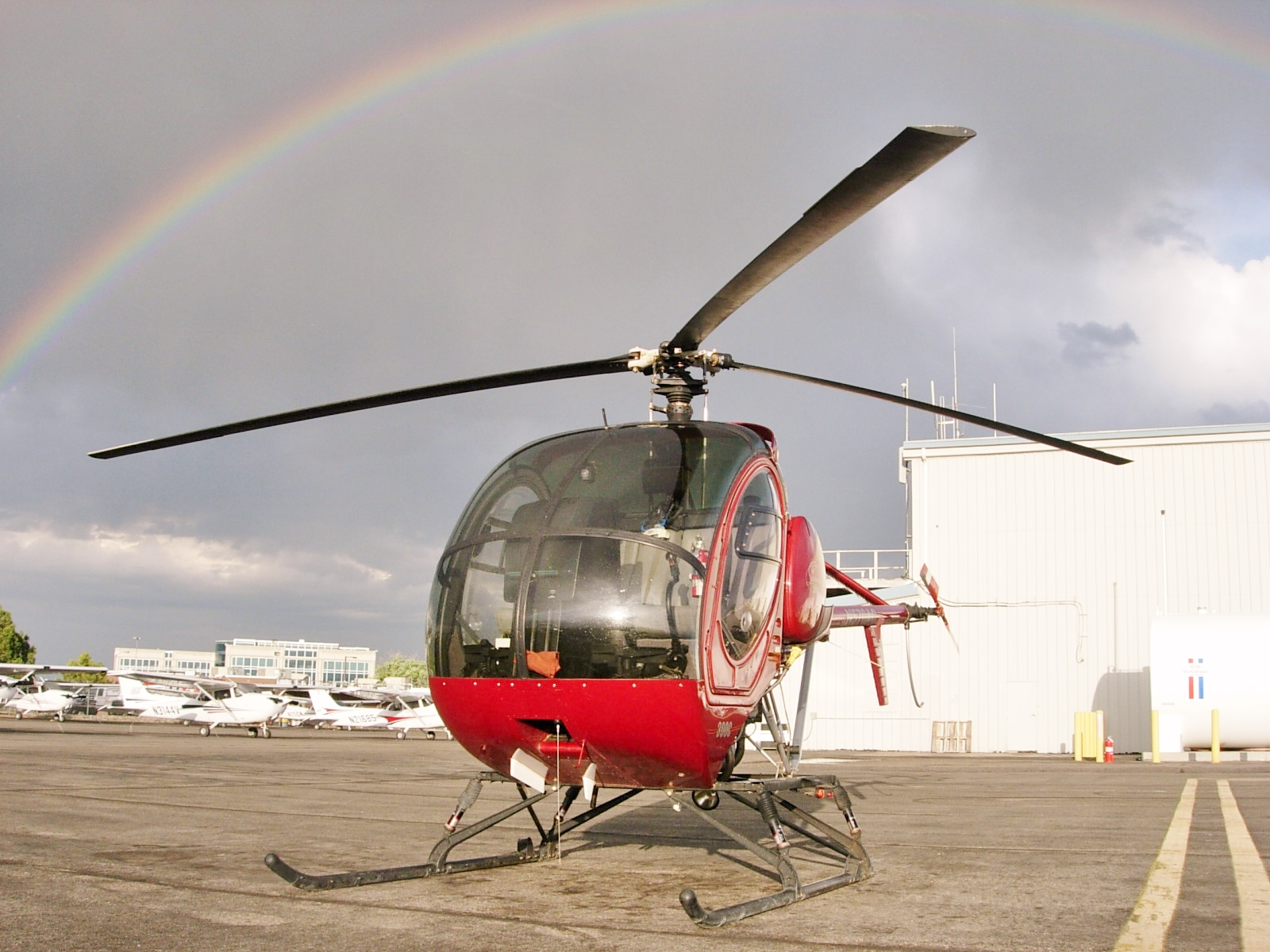
Schweizer 300C

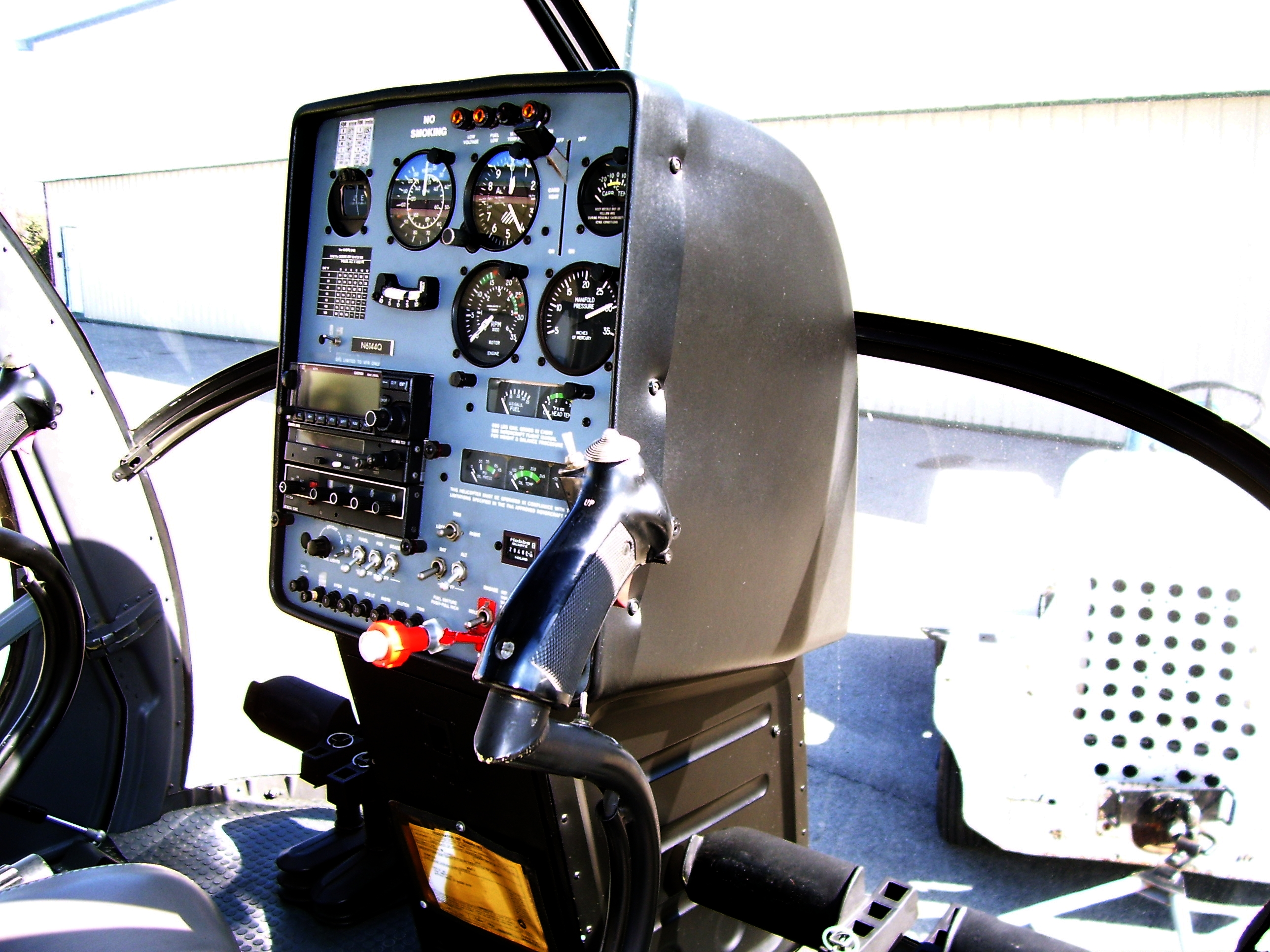
Interior of Schweizer 300CB

269C "Model 300C"
The 300C is powered by a 190 hp (141 kW) Lycoming HIO-360-D1A and has a larger diameter main rotor (26 ft 10 in compared to 25 ft 4 in). The larger rotor and engine gives it a 45% performance increase over previous 269-series models. Hughes and Schweizer both marketed the 269C as the Model 300C.
300CQ
The Sky Knight is a purpose-built 300C for urban police helicopter patrols with a muffler and other noise attenuating materials and design changes to reduce the helicopter's noise signature by 75%.
300CB
The 300CB is the first pure production of the 300 by Schweizer and is powered by a Textron Lycoming HO-360-C1A, 180 hp engine. The 300CB first flew on 28 May 1993, and was certified by the FAA in August 1995. The 300CB can be reconfigured from a two-seat cockpit to a three-seat configuration. While it is still suited for utility and special missions, this aircraft was designed for helicopter training.
300CBi
A fuel injected version of the 300CB that alleviates carburetor icing concerns in colder temperatures. The 300CBi also includes overspeed protection and automatic rotor engagement during startup, as well as a low rotor RPM warning system.

== Operators ==
Argentina

- Argentine Coast Guard

Brazil

- Military Police of Rio de Janeiro State

Colombia

- Colombian Air Force

El Salvador

- Salvadoran Air Force

Greece

- Hellenic Army received 30 Breda-Nardi NH 300C helicopters from November 1985.

Indonesia

- Indonesian Army

Senegal

- Senegalese Air Force

Thailand

- Royal Thai Army

Turkey

- Turkish Army

United States

- Los Angeles County Sheriff's Department

Pakistan

- Pakistan Army

== Accidents and incidents ==
- 8 September 2017: A Schweizer 269C, aircraft registration number N204HF, serial number 0109, crashed during a sightseeing flight at Flying W Airport in Medford, New Jersey, United States, killing the pilot along with guitarist and singer Troy Gentry of the popular American country music band Montgomery Gentry, who were scheduled to perform at a resort at the airport later that day. The crash was attributed to the pilot's loss of control during a power-off autorotation landing attempt; a contributing factor was failure of the throttle control tie-rod assembly caused by improper replacement of the throttle cable.

== Specifications (Schweizer 300C) ==
Data from Jane's All the World's Aircraft 1988–89

General characteristics

- Crew: 1 pilot
- Capacity: 2 passengers / 900 lb (410 kg) payload on external sling
- Length: 30 ft 10 in (9.40 m)
- Height: 8 ft 8 5/8 in (2.66 m)
- Empty weight: 1,046 lb (474 kg)
- Max takeoff weight: 2,050 lb (930 kg)
- Powerplant: 1 × Textron Lycoming HIO-360-D1A 4-cylinder air-cooled horizontally opposed piston engine, 190 hp (140 kW) (derated from 225 hp (168 kW))
- Main rotor diameter: 26 ft 10 in (8.18 m)
- Main rotor area: 565.5 sq ft (52.54 m^{2})
- Blade section: - NACA 0015

Performance

- Maximum speed: 82 kn (94 mph, 152 km/h)
- Cruise speed: 67 kn (77 mph, 124 km/h) (for maximum range, at 4,000 ft (1,200 m)
- Never exceed speed: 91 kn (105 mph, 169 km/h)
- Range: 194 nmi (223 mi, 359 km)
- Endurance: 3 h 24 min
- Service ceiling: 10,200 ft (3,100 m)
- Rate of climb: 750 ft/min (3.8 m/s) at sea level

== In popular culture ==
In the reality TV show "pawn stars" in an episode named "Chopper Gamble" (S02 EP08,February 8 2010) a crashed S300 was bought and restored on the understanding these models were designed to be rebuilt from such a state.

== See also ==
Related development

- Hughes TH-55 Osage
- Sikorsky Firefly
- Schweizer 330 and S333

Aircraft of comparable role, configuration, and era

- Bell 47
- Enstrom F-28
- Guimbal Cabri G2
- Hiller OH-23 Raven
- Robinson R22

== Bibliography ==
- Elliot, Bryn (March–April 1997). "Bears in the Air: The US Air Police Perspective". Air Enthusiast. No. 68. pp. 46–51. ISSN 0143-5450.
- Elliott, Bryn (May–June 1999). "On the Beat: The First 60 Years of Britain's Air Police, Part Two". Air Enthusiast (81): 64–69. ISSN 0143-5450.
- Hatch, Paul F. (28 November 1987). "World's Air Forces 1987". Flight International. Vol. 132, no. 4060. pp. 36–106. ISSN 0015-3710.
- Taylor, John W. R., ed. (1988). Jane's All the World's Aircraft 1988–89. Coulsdon, UK: Jane's Defence Data. ISBN 0-7106-0867-5.
