= Sound level =

Sound level refers to various logarithmic measurements of audible vibrations and may refer to:

- Sound exposure level, measure of the sound exposure of a sound relative to a reference value
- Sound power level, measure of the rate at which sound energy is emitted, reflected, transmitted or received, per unit time
- Sound pressure level, measure of the effective pressure of a sound relative to a reference value
- Sound intensity level, measure of the intensity of a sound relative to a reference value
- Sound velocity level, measure of the effective particle velocity of a sound relative to a reference value

== See also ==
- Audio equalization
- Level (logarithmic quantity)
- Line level
- Loudness
- Volume (disambiguation)
