= Backscattering cross section =

Backscattering cross section is a property of an object that determines what proportion of incident wave energy is scattered from the object, back in the direction of the incident wave.

== Definition ==
=== Physics ===
In physics generally, it is defined as the area which intercepts an amount of power in the incident beam which, if radiated isotropically, would yield a reflected signal strength at the transmitter of the same magnitude as the actual object produces.

=== Underwater acoustics ===
In fisheries acoustics, the same term is used to mean the same area but divided by 4π. In other areas of underwater acoustics, the general physics definition is used.

== See also ==
- Radar cross-section
- Target strength
