= Transmission loss =

Sound measurements
- Characteristic: Symbols
- Sound pressure: p, SPL, L_{PA}
- Particle velocity: v, SVL
- Particle displacement: δ
- Sound intensity: I, SIL
- Sound power: P, SWL, L_{WA}
- Sound energy: W
- Sound energy density: w
- Sound exposure: E, SEL
- Acoustic impedance: Z
- Audio frequency: AF
- Transmission loss: TL

Transmission loss (TL) in general describes the accumulated decrease in intensity of a waveform energy as a wave propagates outwards from a source, or as it propagates through a certain area or through a certain type of structure.

It is a terminology frequently used in radio communication, twisted pair systems (PTSN, Ethernet, etc.), optics and acoustics. Measures of TL are very important in the industry of acoustic devices such as mufflers and sonars.

== Definition ==
Measurement of transmission loss can be in terms of decibels.

Mathematically, transmission loss is measured in dB scale and in general it can be defined using the following formula:

TL = $10 \log_{10} \left\vert {W_i \over W_t}\right\vert$ dB

where:

- $W_i$ is the power of incident wave coming towards a defined area (or structure);
- $W_t$ is the power of transmitted wave going away from the defined area (or structure).

== Applications ==
Transmission loss may refer to a more specific concept in one of the fields below:

- Transmission loss in electrical engineering describes the decrease of electrical power along an electrical cable. The term has its origins in telephony.
- Transmission loss in duct acoustics describes the acoustic performances of a muffler like system.
- Transmission loss in room acoustics describes the decrease of sound intensity that is reduced by a wall or other structure at a given frequency.
- Transmission loss in underwater acoustics describes the decrease of sound intensity that is reduced by a bubble curtain or other damping structure at a given frequency. The same term is sometimes used to mean propagation loss, which is a measure of the reduction in sound intensity between the sound source and a receiver, defined as the difference between the source level and the sound pressure level at the receiver.

== Types ==
- Transmission loss types in fiber-optic communication include absorption loss, scattering loss, dispersion loss, radiation loss and coupling loss.
- Transmission loss types in twisted pair transmission systems include conductor loss, dielectric loss as well as radiation loss.
