= Specsmanship =

Specsmanship is the use of specifications or measurement results to suggest or establish putative superiority of one entity over another, especially when it is inappropriate. It is commonly found in advertising of high fidelity audio equipment, automobiles, digital cameras, electronic display devices, and other merchandise.

Specsmanship may identify some numerical figure of merit upon which to base pride or derision, whether or not it is relevant to actual use of the device.
