= Haikubox =

Automatic birdsong identifier

Haikubox is an artificial intelligence (AI)-enabled device which automatically and continuously identifies backyard birds using their vocalizations. Haikubox was developed by Loggerhead Instruments which also develops and manufactures bioacoustics equipment for oceanographic research.

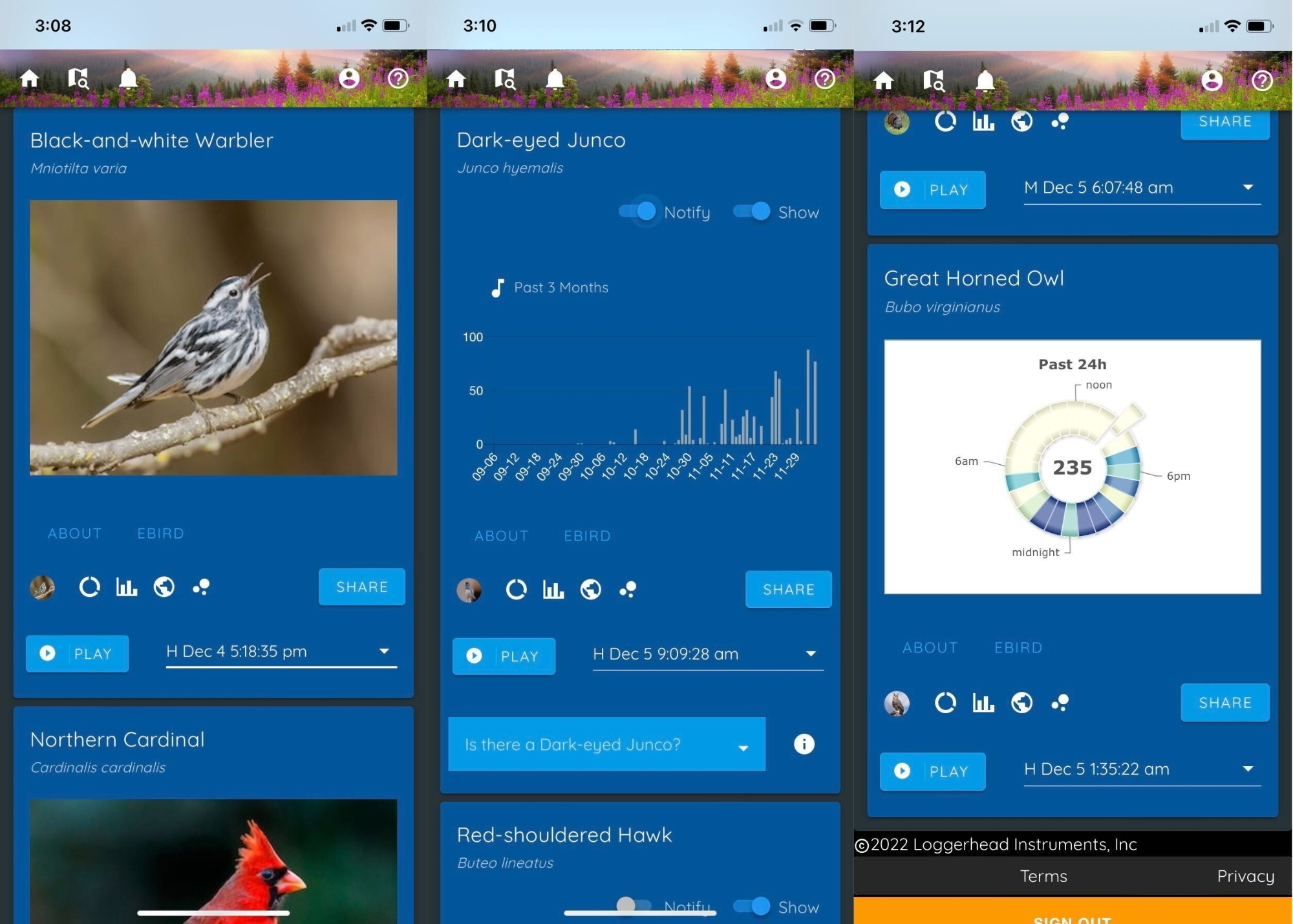
Haikubox website and mobile app

Haikubox uses a neural net developed through a collaboration with the creators of BirdNET Sound ID at the Cornell Lab of Ornithology's K. Lisa Yang Center for Conservation Bioacoustics.

Each Haikubox becomes a node in a passive acoustic monitoring (PAM) network which researchers can use to map bird behavior. PAM, especially when paired with machine learning, is emerging as an efficient, non-invasive and low-cost way to study animals and their behavioral responses to environmental change. As of January 1, 2025, over one billion bird recordings have been captured by Haikuboxes.

Haikubox data was used to study the April 8, 2024 total solar eclipse that crossed North America, and the peer-reviewed findings were published in Scientific Reports. The study found that at locations experiencing more than 99 percent obscurity, and in the absence of human vocalizations, birds generally stopped vocalizing, but that there was variability between locations and individual species responses.

An article published online by bioGraphic and later in Living Bird Magazine, summarized the history of bioacoustics and outlined the potential of PAM to revolutionize scientific research and conservation efforts, noting that Haikubox is "one of the products of this revolution."

Haikubox was named a TIME Best Invention 2024 and has been reviewed in WIRED Magazine, Audubon Magazine, Birdwatching Magazine, and Axios Tampa Bay, and appeared on the WIRED Wish List 2022 and a 2023 guide to best bird watching gear.

The device was named "Haikubox" because it observes nature, much like haiku poems which capture a moment in time and often focus on nature imagery.

Development of Haikubox was supported in large part by National Science Foundation's SBIR (Small Business Innovation Research) funding (Cooperative Agreement No. 2135664).

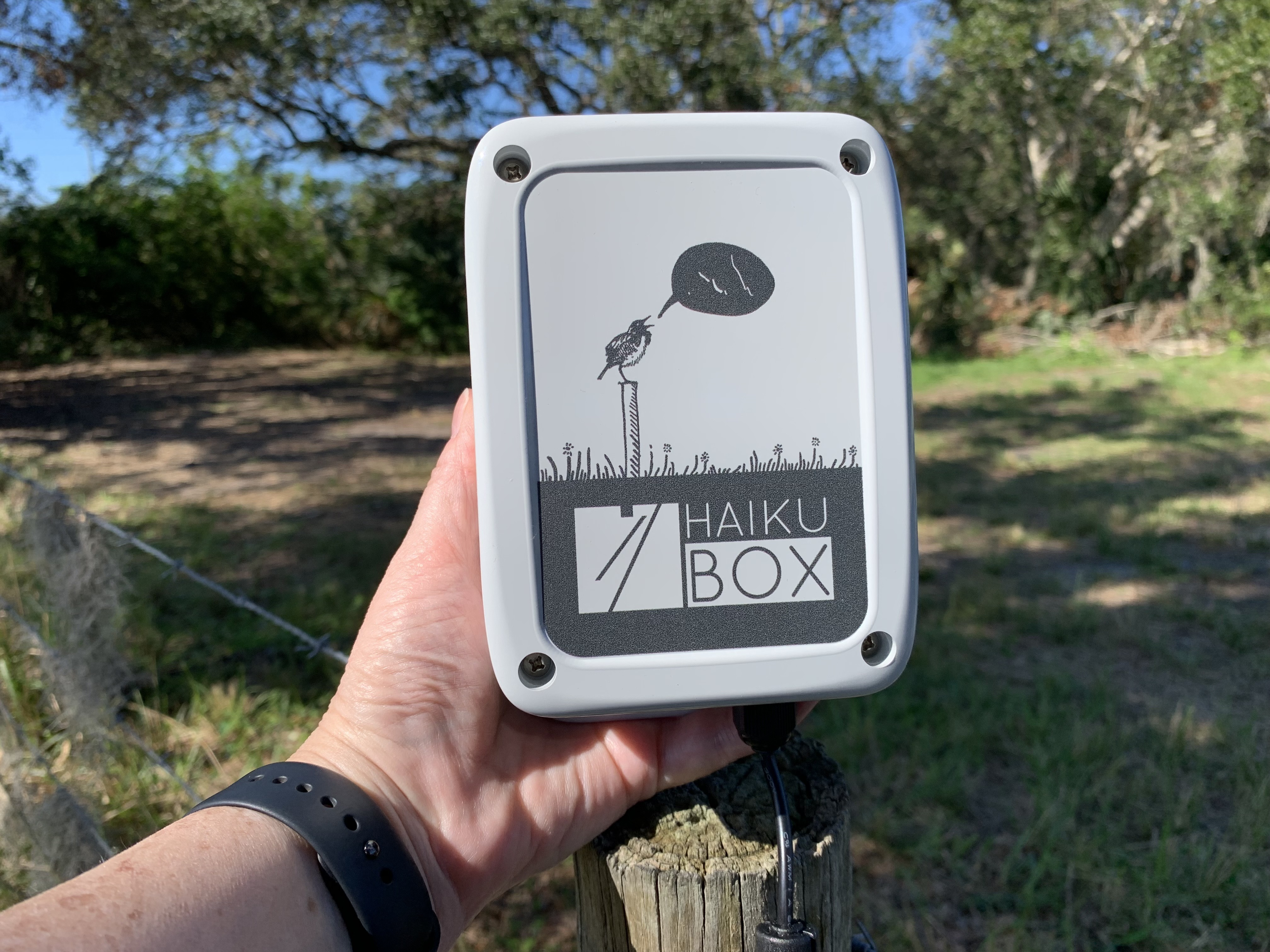
