= Classical mechanics =

Description of large objects' physics

Diagram of orbital motion of a satellite around the Earth, showing perpendicular velocity and acceleration vectors, represented through a classical interpretation

In physics, classical mechanics is a theory that describes the effect of forces on the motion of macroscopic objects and bulk matter, without considering quantum effects, and often without incorporating relativistic effects either.

It is used in describing the motion of objects such as projectiles and particles, parts of machinery, spacecraft, planets, stars, galaxies, deformable solids, fluids, macromolecules and other objects. The development of classical mechanics involved substantial change in the methods and philosophy of physics. The qualifier classical distinguishes this type of mechanics from new methods developed after the revolutions in physics of the early 20th century which revealed limitations in classical mechanics. Some modern sources include relativistic mechanics in classical mechanics, as representing the subject matter in its most developed and accurate form.

The earliest formulation of classical mechanics is often referred to as Newtonian mechanics. It consists of the physical concepts based on the 17th century foundational works of Sir Isaac Newton, and the mathematical methods invented by Newton, Gottfried Wilhelm Leibniz, Leonhard Euler and others to describe the motion of bodies under the influence of forces. Later, methods based on energy were developed by Euler, Joseph-Louis Lagrange, William Rowan Hamilton and others, leading to the development of analytical mechanics (which includes Lagrangian mechanics and Hamiltonian mechanics). These advances, made predominantly in the 18th and 19th centuries, extended beyond earlier works; they are, with some modification, used in all areas of modern physics.

If the present state of an object that obeys the laws of classical mechanics is known, it is possible to determine how it will move in the future, and how it has moved in the past. Chaos theory shows that the long term predictions of classical mechanics are not reliable. Classical mechanics provides accurate results when studying objects that are not extremely massive and have speeds not approaching the speed of light. With objects about the size of an atom's diameter, it becomes necessary to use quantum mechanics. To describe velocities approaching the speed of light, special relativity is needed. In cases where objects become extremely massive, general relativity becomes applicable.

== Branches ==
=== Traditional division ===
Classical mechanics was traditionally divided into three main branches. Statics is the branch of classical mechanics that is concerned with the analysis of force and torque acting on a physical system that does not experience an acceleration, but rather is in equilibrium with its environment. Kinematics describes the motion of points, bodies (objects), and systems of bodies (groups of objects) without considering the forces that cause them to move. Kinematics, as a field of study, is often referred to as the "geometry of motion" and is occasionally seen as a branch of mathematics. Dynamics goes beyond merely describing objects' behavior and also considers the forces which explain it. Some authors (for example Greenwood (1997)) include special relativity within classical dynamics.

=== Forces vs. energy ===
Another division is based on the choice of mathematical formalism. Classical mechanics can be mathematically presented in multiple different ways. The physical content of these different formulations is the same, but they provide different insights and facilitate different types of calculations. While the term "Newtonian mechanics" is sometimes used as a synonym for non-relativistic classical physics, it can also refer to a particular formalism based on Newton's laws of motion. Newtonian mechanics in this sense emphasizes force as a vector quantity.

In contrast, analytical mechanics uses scalar properties of motion representing the system as a whole—usually its kinetic energy and potential energy. The equations of motion are derived from the scalar quantity by some underlying principle about the scalar's variation. Two dominant branches of analytical mechanics are Lagrangian mechanics, which uses generalized coordinates and corresponding generalized velocities in tangent bundle space (the tangent bundle of the configuration space and sometimes called "state space"), and Hamiltonian mechanics, which uses coordinates and corresponding momenta in phase space (the cotangent bundle of the configuration space). Both formulations are equivalent by a Legendre transformation on the generalized coordinates, velocities and momenta; therefore, both contain the same information for describing the dynamics of a system. There are other formulations such as Hamilton–Jacobi theory, Routhian mechanics, and Appell's equation of motion. All equations of motion for particles and fields, in any formalism, can be derived from the widely applicable result called the principle of least action. One result is Noether's theorem, a statement which connects conservation laws to their associated symmetries.

=== By region of application ===
Alternatively, a division can be made by region of application:

- Celestial mechanics, relating to stars, planets and other celestial bodies
- Continuum mechanics, for materials modelled as a continuum, e.g., solids and fluids (i.e., liquids and gases).
- Relativistic mechanics (i.e. including the special and general theories of relativity), for bodies whose speed is greater than a small fraction of the speed of light.
- Statistical mechanics, which provides a framework for relating the microscopic properties of individual atoms and molecules to the macroscopic or bulk thermodynamic properties of materials.

== Description of objects and their motion ==
The analysis of projectile motion is a part of classical mechanics.

Classical mechanics models real-world objects as point particles, that is, objects with negligible size. Classical mechanics describes the motions of extended non-pointlike objects by considering these objects to be aggregates of rigidly connected particles.

In the Newtonian form of classical mechanics the motion of a point particle is determined by a small number of parameters: its position, mass, and the forces applied to it. Euler's laws provide extensions to Newton's laws in this area. The concepts of angular momentum rely on the same calculus used to describe one-dimensional motion. The rocket equation extends the notion of rate of change of an object's momentum to include the effects of an object "losing mass". (These generalizations/extensions are derived from Newton's laws, say, by decomposing a solid body into a collection of points.)

In reality, the kind of objects that classical mechanics can describe always have a non-zero size. (The behavior of very small particles, such as the electron, is more accurately described by quantum mechanics.) Objects with non-zero size have more complicated behavior than hypothetical point particles, because of the additional degrees of freedom, e.g., a baseball can spin while it is moving. However, the results for point particles can be used to study such objects by treating them as composite objects, made of a large number of collectively acting point particles. The center of mass of a composite object behaves like a point particle.

Classical mechanics assumes that matter and energy have definite, knowable attributes such as location in space and speed. Non-relativistic mechanics also assumes that forces act instantaneously (see also Action at a distance).

=== Kinematics ===
The SI derived "mechanical" (that is, not electromagnetic or thermal) units with kg, m and s
position	m
angular position/angle	unitless (radian)
velocity	m·s^{−1}
angular velocity	s^{−1}
acceleration	m·s^{−2}
angular acceleration	s^{−2}
jerk	m·s^{−3}
"angular jerk"	s^{−3}
specific energy	m^{2}·s^{−2}
absorbed dose rate	m^{2}·s^{−3}
moment of inertia	kg·m^{2}
momentum	kg·m·s^{−1}
angular momentum	kg·m^{2}·s^{−1}
force	kg·m·s^{−2}
torque	kg·m^{2}·s^{−2}
energy	kg·m^{2}·s^{−2}
power	kg·m^{2}·s^{−3}
pressure and energy density	kg·m^{−1}·s^{−2}
surface tension	kg·s^{−2}
spring constant	kg·s^{−2}
irradiance and energy flux	kg·s^{−3}
kinematic viscosity	m^{2}·s^{−1}
dynamic viscosity	kg·m^{−1}·s^{−1}
density (mass density)	kg·m^{−3}
specific weight (weight density)	kg·m^{−2}·s^{−2}
number density	m^{−3}
action	kg·m^{2}·s^{−1}

The position of a point particle is defined in relation to a coordinate system centered on an arbitrary fixed reference point in space called the origin O. A simple coordinate system might describe the position of a particle P with a vector notated by an arrow labeled r that points from the origin O to point P. In general, the point particle does not need to be stationary relative to O. In cases where P is moving relative to O, r is defined as a function of t, time. In pre-Einstein relativity (known as Galilean relativity), time is considered an absolute, i.e., the time interval that is observed to elapse between any given pair of events is the same for all observers. In addition to relying on absolute time, classical mechanics assumes Euclidean geometry for the structure of space.

==== Velocity and speed ====
The velocity, or the rate of change of displacement with time, is defined as the derivative of the position with respect to time:

$$\mathbf{v} = {\mathrm{d}\mathbf{r} \over \mathrm{d}t}\,\!$$.

In classical mechanics, velocities are directly additive and subtractive. For example, if one car travels east at 60 km/h and passes another car traveling in the same direction at 50 km/h, the slower car perceives the faster car as traveling east at 60 − 50 = 10 km/h. However, from the perspective of the faster car, the slower car is moving 10 km/h to the west, often denoted as −10 km/h where the sign implies opposite direction. Velocities are directly additive as vector quantities; they must be dealt with using vector analysis.

Mathematically, if the velocity of the first object in the previous discussion is denoted by the vector u = ud and the velocity of the second object by the vector v = ve, where u is the speed of the first object, v is the speed of the second object, and d and e are unit vectors in the directions of motion of each object respectively, then the velocity of the first object as seen by the second object is:

$$\mathbf{u}' = \mathbf{u} - \mathbf{v} \, .$$

Similarly, the first object sees the velocity of the second object as:

$$\mathbf{v'}= \mathbf{v} - \mathbf{u} \, .$$

When both objects are moving in the same direction, this equation can be simplified to:

$$\mathbf{u}' = ( u - v ) \mathbf{d} \, .$$

Or, by ignoring direction, the difference can be given in terms of speed only:

$$u' = u - v \, .$$

==== Acceleration ====
The acceleration, or rate of change of velocity, is the derivative of the velocity with respect to time (the second derivative of the position with respect to time):

$$\mathbf{a} = {\mathrm{d}\mathbf{v} \over \mathrm{d}t} = {\mathrm{d^2}\mathbf{r} \over \mathrm{d}t^2}.$$

Acceleration represents the velocity's change over time. Velocity can change in magnitude, direction, or both. Occasionally, a decrease in the magnitude of velocity "v" is referred to as deceleration, but generally any change in the velocity over time, including deceleration, is referred to as acceleration.

==== Frames of reference ====
While the position, velocity and acceleration of a particle can be described with respect to any observer in any state of motion, classical mechanics assumes the existence of a special family of reference frames in which the mechanical laws of nature take a comparatively simple form. These special reference frames are called inertial frames. An inertial frame is an idealized frame of reference within which an object with zero net force acting upon it moves with a constant velocity; that is, it is either at rest or moving uniformly in a straight line. In an inertial frame Newton's law of motion, $F=ma$, is valid.

Non-inertial reference frames accelerate in relation to another inertial frame. A body rotating with respect to an inertial frame is not an inertial frame. When viewed from an inertial frame, particles in the non-inertial frame appear to move in ways not explained by forces from existing fields in the reference frame. Hence, it appears that there are other forces that enter the equations of motion solely as a result of the relative acceleration. These forces are referred to as fictitious forces, inertia forces, or pseudo-forces.

Consider two reference frames S and S'. For observers in each of the reference frames an event has space-time coordinates of (x,y,z,t) in frame S and (x',y',z',t') in frame S'. Assuming time is measured the same in all reference frames, if we require x = x' when t = 0, then the relation between the space-time coordinates of the same event observed from the reference frames S' and S, which are moving at a relative velocity u in the x direction, is:

$$\begin{align}
x' &= x - tu,\\
y' &= y, \\
z' &= z, \\
t' &= t.
\end{align}$$

This set of formulas defines a group transformation known as the Galilean transformation (informally, the Galilean transform). This group is a limiting case of the Poincaré group used in special relativity. The limiting case applies when the velocity u is very small compared to c, the speed of light.

The transformations have the following consequences:

- v′ = v − u (the velocity v′ of a particle from the perspective of S′ is slower by u than its velocity v from the perspective of S)
- a′ = a (the acceleration of a particle is the same in any inertial reference frame)
- F′ = F (the force on a particle is the same in any inertial reference frame)
- the speed of light is not a constant in classical mechanics, nor does the special position given to the speed of light in relativistic mechanics have a counterpart in classical mechanics.

For some problems, it is convenient to use rotating coordinates (reference frames). Thereby one can either keep a mapping to a convenient inertial frame, or introduce additionally a fictitious centrifugal force and Coriolis force.

== Newtonian mechanics ==
A force in physics is any action that causes an object's velocity to change; that is, to accelerate. A force originates from within a field, such as an electro-static field (caused by static electrical charges), electro-magnetic field (caused by moving charges), or gravitational field (caused by mass), among others.

Newton was the first to mathematically express the relationship between force and momentum. Some physicists interpret Newton's second law of motion as a definition of force and mass, while others consider it a fundamental postulate, a law of nature. Either interpretation has the same mathematical consequences, historically known as "Newton's second law":

$$\mathbf{F} = {\mathrm{d}\mathbf{p} \over \mathrm{d}t} = {\mathrm{d}(m \mathbf{v}) \over \mathrm{d}t}.$$

The quantity mv is called the (canonical) momentum. The net force on a particle is thus equal to the rate of change of the momentum of the particle with time. Since the definition of acceleration is a = dv/dt, the second law can be written in the simplified and more familiar form:

$$\mathbf{F} = m \mathbf{a} \, .$$

So long as the force acting on a particle is known, Newton's second law is sufficient to describe the motion of a particle. Once independent relations for each force acting on a particle are available, they can be substituted into Newton's second law to obtain an ordinary differential equation, which is called the equation of motion.

As an example, assume that friction is the only force acting on the particle, and that it may be modeled as a function of the velocity of the particle, for example:

$$\mathbf{F}_{\rm R} = - \lambda \mathbf{v} \, ,$$

where λ is a positive constant, the negative sign states that the force is opposite the sense of the velocity. Then the equation of motion is

$$- \lambda \mathbf{v} = m \mathbf{a} = m {\mathrm{d}\mathbf{v} \over \mathrm{d}t} \, .$$

This can be integrated to obtain

$$\mathbf{v} = \mathbf{v}_0 e^{{-\lambda t}/{m}}$$

where v_{0} is the initial velocity. This means that the velocity of this particle decays exponentially to zero as time progresses. In this case, an equivalent viewpoint is that the kinetic energy of the particle is absorbed by friction (which converts it to heat energy in accordance with the conservation of energy), and the particle is slowing down. This expression can be further integrated to obtain the position r of the particle as a function of time.

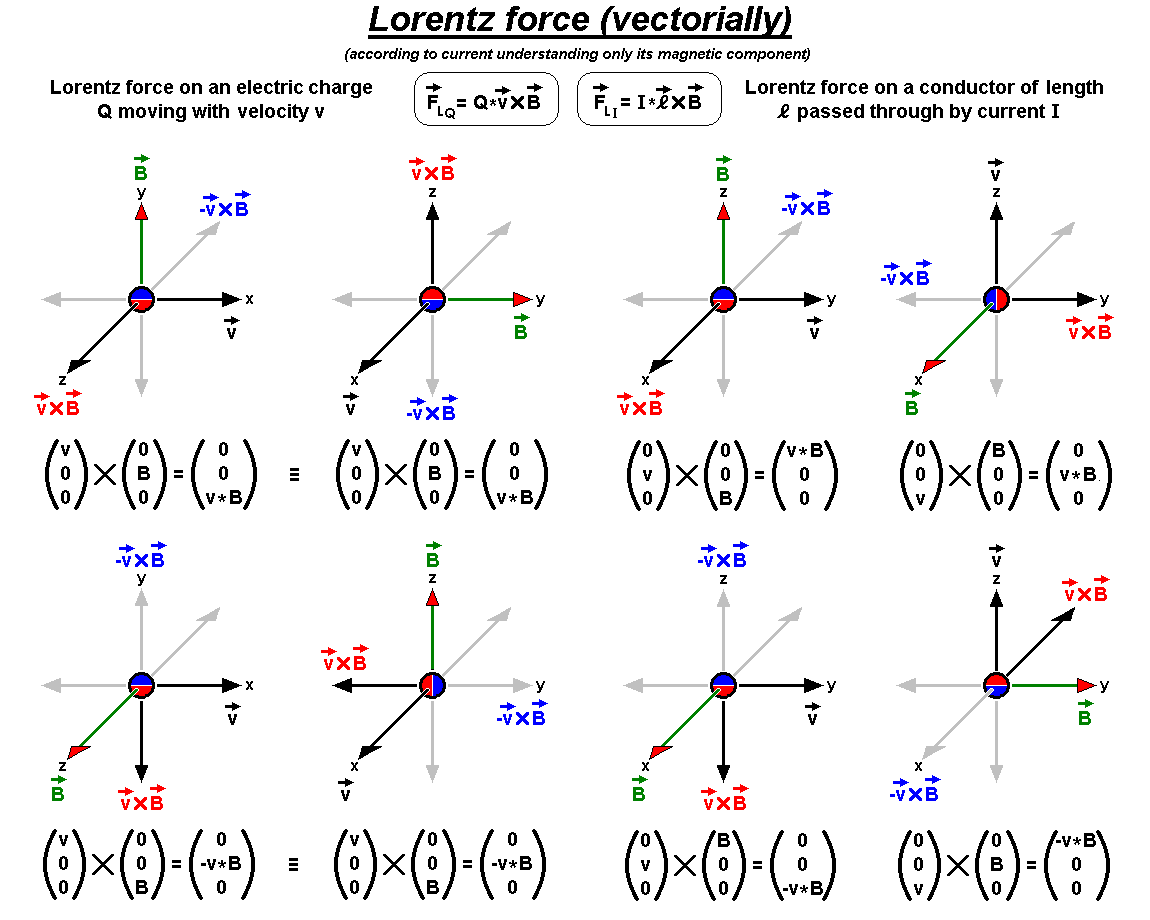
Illustration of how the non-central Lorentz force needs to take into account the direction and relative reference frames to calculate the cross product of vectors.

Newton's third law can be used to deduce the forces acting on a particle when in a closed system. If it is known that particle A exerts a force F on another particle B, it follows that B must exert an equal and opposite reaction force, −F, on A. For conservative forces, this means that the line integral around a closed loop is zero. The strong form of Newton's third law requires that F and −F act along the line connecting A and B, and these forces are defined as central forces. However, central forces are an approximation since objects that are at rest are only at rest with respect to one another. This limitation to Newton's third law can be shown using the Coulomb force, where charges must remain stationary with respect to a nonaccelerating frame of reference. When dealing with non-central forces like the Lorentz force, the weak form of Newton's third law is used by identifying conservation of momentum. Illustrations of the weak form of Newton's third law can be found for magnetic forces like the Lorentz force while discussing the curl or cross product of vectors. Thus, the forces acting on objects cannot be identified without accounting for relative acceleration and direction by utilizing reference frames.

=== Work and energy ===
If a constant force F applied to a particle displaces it from position r_{initial} to r_{final}, then the work done, $W,$ by the force is defined as the scalar product of that force and the displacement vector Δr = r_{final} − r_{initial}:

$$W = \mathbf{F} \cdot \Delta \mathbf{r} \, .$$

More generally, if the force varies as a function of position as the particle moves from r_{1} to r_{2} along a path C, the work done on the particle is given by the line integral

$$W = \int_C \mathbf{F}(\mathbf{r}) \cdot \mathrm{d}\mathbf{r} \, .$$

If the work done in moving the particle from r_{1} to r_{2} is the same no matter what path is taken, the force is said to be conservative. Gravity is a conservative force, as is the force due to an idealized spring, as given by Hooke's law. The force due to friction is non-conservative.

The kinetic energy E_{k} of a particle of mass m travelling at speed v is given by

$$E_\mathrm{k} = \tfrac{1}{2}mv^2 \, .$$

For extended objects composed of many particles, the kinetic energy of the composite body is the sum of the kinetic energies of the particles.

The work–energy theorem states that for a particle of constant mass m, the total work W done on the particle as it moves from position r_{1} to r_{2} is equal to the change in kinetic energy E_{k} of the particle:

$$W = \Delta E_\mathrm{k} = E_\mathrm{k_2} - E_\mathrm{k_1} = \tfrac{1}{2} m \left(v_2^{\, 2} - v_1^{\, 2}\right) .$$

Conservative forces can be expressed as the gradient of a scalar function, known as the potential energy and denoted E_{p}:

$$\mathbf{F} = - \mathbf{\nabla} E_\mathrm{p} \, .$$

If all the forces acting on a particle are conservative, and E_{p} is the total potential energy (which is defined as a work of involved forces to rearrange mutual positions of bodies), obtained by summing the potential energies corresponding to each force

$$\mathbf{F} \cdot \Delta \mathbf{r} = - \mathbf{\nabla} E_\mathrm{p} \cdot \Delta \mathbf{r} = - \Delta E_\mathrm{p} \, .$$

The decrease in the potential energy is equal to the increase in the kinetic energy

$$-\Delta E_\mathrm{p} = \Delta E_\mathrm{k} \Rightarrow \Delta (E_\mathrm{k} + E_\mathrm{p}) = 0 \, .$$

This result is known as conservation of energy and states that the total energy,

$$\sum E = E_\mathrm{k} + E_\mathrm{p} \, ,$$

is constant in time. It is often useful, because many commonly encountered forces are conservative.

== Lagrangian mechanics ==
Lagrangian mechanics is a formulation of classical mechanics founded on the stationary-action principle (also known as the principle of least action). It was introduced by the Italian-French mathematician and astronomer Joseph-Louis Lagrange in his presentation to the Turin Academy of Science in 1760 culminating in his 1788 grand opus, Mécanique analytique. Lagrangian mechanics describes a mechanical system as a pair $(M,L)$ consisting of a configuration space $M$ and a smooth function $L$ within that space called a Lagrangian. For many systems, $L = T - V,$ where $T$ and $V$ are the kinetic and potential energy of the system, respectively. The stationary action principle requires that the action functional of the system derived from $L$ must remain at a stationary point (a maximum, minimum, or saddle) throughout the time evolution of the system. This constraint allows the calculation of the equations of motion of the system using Lagrange's equations.

== Hamiltonian mechanics ==
Hamiltonian mechanics emerged in 1833 as a reformulation of Lagrangian mechanics. Introduced by Sir William Rowan Hamilton, Hamiltonian mechanics replaces (generalized) velocities $\dot q^i$ used in Lagrangian mechanics with (generalized) momenta. Both theories provide interpretations of classical mechanics and describe the same physical phenomena. Hamiltonian mechanics has a close relationship with geometry (notably, symplectic geometry and Poisson structures) and serves as a link between classical and quantum mechanics.

In this formalism, the dynamics of a system are governed by Hamilton's equations, which express the time derivatives of position and momentum variables in terms of partial derivatives of a function called the Hamiltonian:
$$\frac{\mathrm{d}\boldsymbol{q}}{\mathrm{d}t} = \frac{\partial \mathcal H}{\partial \boldsymbol{p}},\quad
\frac{\mathrm{d}\boldsymbol{p}}{\mathrm{d}t} = -\frac{\partial \mathcal H}{\partial \boldsymbol{q}}.$$
The Hamiltonian is the Legendre transform of the Lagrangian, and in many situations of physical interest it is equal to the total energy of the system.

== Foundational character ==
Classical mechanics has a wide range of application but its impact on physics is not limited to its practical applications. The techniques and point of view in classical mechanics is a critical foundation for modern physics. The mathematical techniques of classical mechanics have been adapted far beyond their original source of inspiration.

== Limits of validity ==
Domain of validity for classical mechanics

When both quantum mechanics and classical mechanics cannot apply, such as at the quantum level with many degrees of freedom, quantum field theory (QFT) is of use. QFT deals with small distances, and large speeds with many degrees of freedom as well as the possibility of any change in the number of particles throughout the interaction. When treating large degrees of freedom at the macroscopic level, statistical mechanics becomes useful. Statistical mechanics describes the behavior of large (but countable) numbers of particles and their interactions as a whole at the macroscopic level. Statistical mechanics is mainly used in thermodynamics for systems that lie outside the bounds of the assumptions of classical thermodynamics. In the case of high velocity objects approaching the speed of light, classical mechanics is enhanced by special relativity. In case that objects become extremely heavy (i.e., their Schwarzschild radius is not negligibly small for a given application), deviations from Newtonian mechanics become apparent and can be quantified by using the parameterized post-Newtonian formalism. In that case, general relativity (GR) becomes applicable. However, until now there is no theory of quantum gravity unifying GR and QFT in the sense that it could be used when objects become extremely small and heavy.^{[4][5]}

=== Newtonian approximation to special relativity ===
In special relativity, the momentum of a particle is given by

$$\mathbf{p} = \frac{m \mathbf{v}}{ \sqrt{1 - \frac{v^2}{c^2}}} \, ,$$

where m is the particle's rest mass, v its velocity, v is the modulus of v, and c is the speed of light.

If v is very small compared to c, v^{2}/c^{2} is approximately zero, and so

$$\mathbf{p} \approx m\mathbf{v} \, .$$

Thus the Newtonian equation p = mv is an approximation of the relativistic equation for bodies moving with low speeds compared to the speed of light.

For example, the relativistic cyclotron frequency of a cyclotron, gyrotron, or high voltage magnetron is given by

$$f = f_\mathrm{c}\frac{m_0}{m_0 + \frac{T}{c^2}} \, ,$$

where f_{c} is the classical frequency of an electron (or other charged particle) with kinetic energy T and (rest) mass m_{0} circling in a magnetic field. The (rest) mass of an electron is 511 keV. So the frequency correction is 1% for a magnetic vacuum tube with a 5.11 kV direct current accelerating voltage.

=== Classical approximation to quantum mechanics ===
The ray approximation of classical mechanics breaks down when the de Broglie wavelength is not much smaller than other dimensions of the system. For non-relativistic particles, this wavelength is

$$\lambda=\frac{h}{p}$$

where h is the Planck constant and p is the momentum.

Again, this happens with electrons before it happens with heavier particles. For example, the electrons used by Clinton Davisson and Lester Germer in 1927, accelerated by 54 V, had a wavelength of 0.167 nm, which was long enough to exhibit a single diffraction side lobe when reflecting from the face of a nickel crystal with atomic spacing of 0.215 nm. With a larger vacuum chamber, it would seem relatively easy to increase the angular resolution from around a radian to a milliradian and see quantum diffraction from the periodic patterns of integrated circuit computer memory.

More practical examples of the failure of classical mechanics on an engineering scale are conduction by quantum tunneling in tunnel diodes and very narrow transistor gates in integrated circuits.

Classical mechanics is the same extreme high frequency approximation as geometric optics. It is more often accurate because it describes particles and bodies with rest mass. These have more momentum and therefore shorter De Broglie wavelengths than massless particles, such as light, with the same kinetic energies.

== History ==
The study of the motion of bodies is an ancient one, making classical mechanics one of the oldest and largest subjects in science, engineering, and technology. The development of classical mechanics lead to the development of many areas of mathematics.

Some Greek philosophers of antiquity, among them Aristotle, founder of Aristotelian physics, may have been the first to maintain the idea that "everything happens for a reason" and that theoretical principles can assist in the understanding of nature. While to a modern reader, many of these preserved ideas come forth as eminently reasonable, there is a conspicuous lack of both mathematical theory and controlled experiment, as we know it. These later became decisive factors in forming modern science, and their early application came to be known as classical mechanics. In his Elementa super demonstrationem ponderum, medieval mathematician Jordanus de Nemore introduced the concept of "positional gravity" and the use of component forces.

Three stage Theory of impetus according to Albert of Saxony

The first modern description of the motions of planets was Johannes Kepler's Astronomia nova, published in 1609. He concluded, based on Tycho Brahe's observations on the orbit of Mars, that the planet's orbits were ellipses. This break with ancient thought was happening around the same time that Galileo was proposing abstract mathematical laws for the motion of objects. Galileo may (or may not) have performed the famous experiment of dropping two cannonballs of different weights from the tower of Pisa, showing that they both hit the ground at the same time. The reality of that particular experiment is disputed, but he did carry out quantitative experiments by rolling balls on an inclined plane. His theory of accelerated motion was derived from the results of such experiments and forms a cornerstone of classical mechanics. Galileo's mathematical treatment of acceleration and his concept of impetus grew out of earlier medieval analyses of motion, especially those of Avicenna, Ibn Bajjah, and Jean Buridan.

In 1673 Christiaan Huygens described in his Horologium Oscillatorium the first two laws of motion. The work is also the first modern treatise in which a physical problem (the accelerated motion of a falling body) is idealized by a set of parameters then analyzed mathematically and constitutes one of the seminal works of applied mathematics.

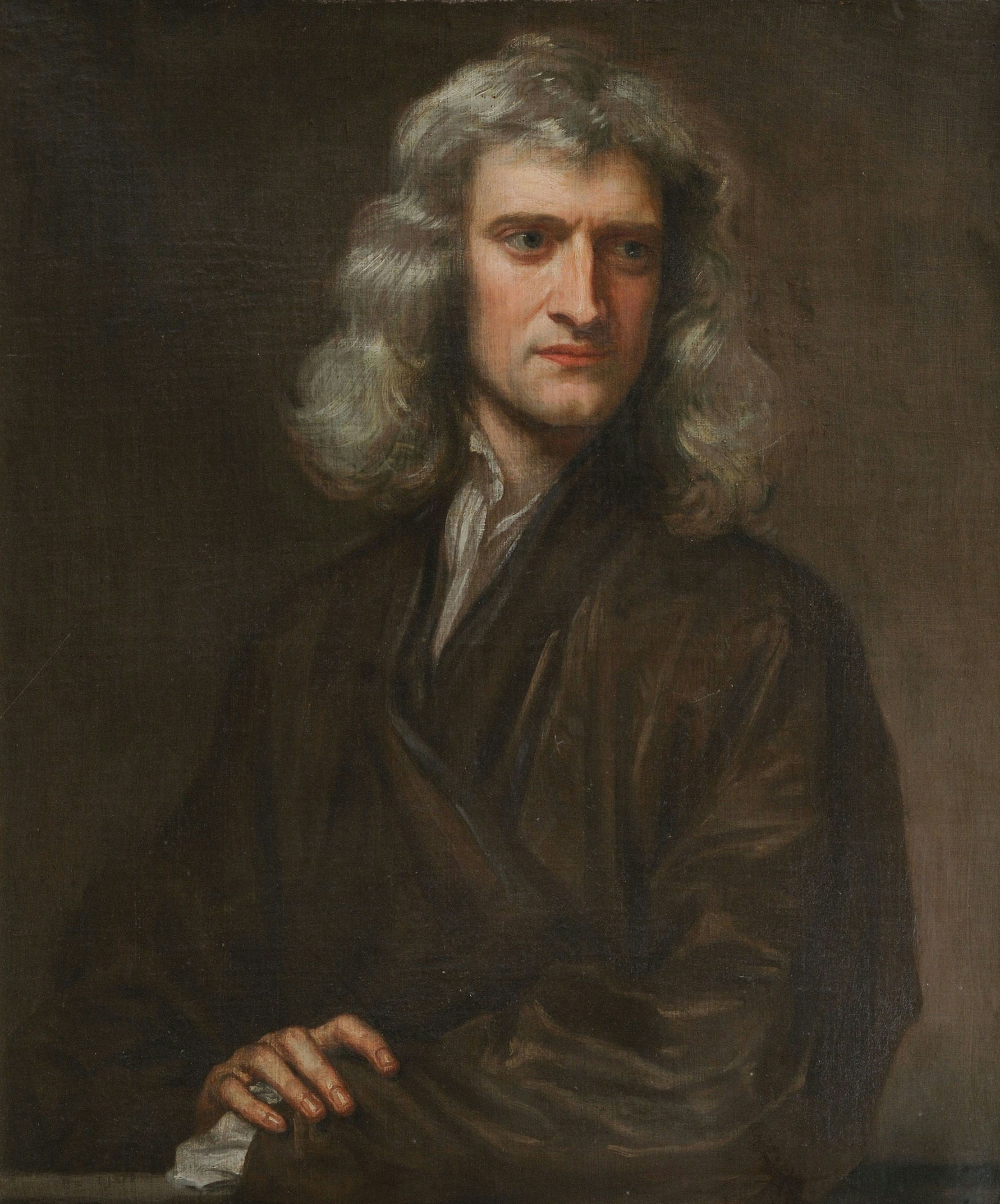
Sir Isaac Newton (1643–1727), an influential figure in the history of physics and whose three laws of motion form the basis of classical mechanics

Newton founded his principles of natural philosophy on three proposed laws of motion: the law of inertia, his second law of acceleration (mentioned above), and the law of action and reaction; and hence laid the foundations for classical mechanics. Both Newton's second and third laws were given the proper scientific and mathematical treatment in Newton's Philosophiæ Naturalis Principia Mathematica. Here they are distinguished from earlier attempts at explaining similar phenomena, which were either incomplete, incorrect, or given little accurate mathematical expression. Newton also enunciated the principles of conservation of momentum and angular momentum.

In mechanics, Newton provided the first correct scientific and mathematical formulation of gravity in Newton's law of universal gravitation. The combination of Newton's laws of motion and gravitation provides the fullest and most accurate description of classical mechanics. He demonstrated that these laws apply to everyday objects as well as to celestial objects. In particular, he obtained a theoretical explanation of Kepler's laws of motion of the planets.

Newton had previously invented the calculus; however, the Principia was formulated entirely in terms of long-established geometric methods in emulation of Euclid. Newton, and most of his contemporaries, with the notable exception of Huygens, worked on the assumption that classical mechanics would be able to explain all phenomena, including light, in the form of geometric optics. Even when discovering the so-called Newton's rings (a wave interference phenomenon) he maintained his own corpuscular theory of light.

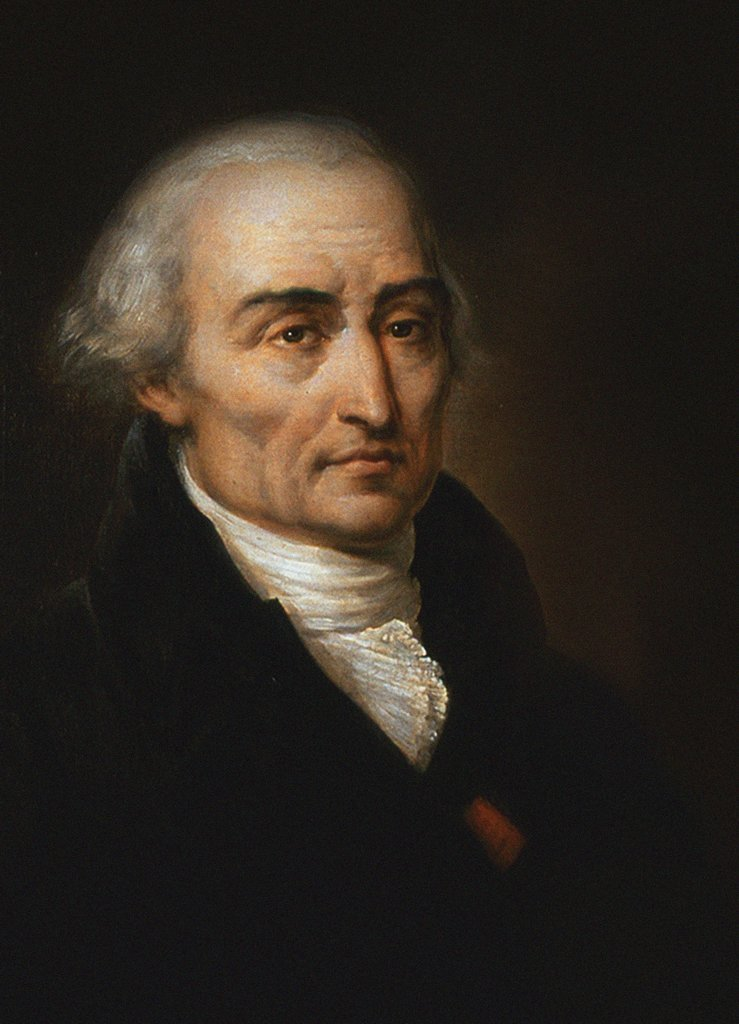
Lagrange's contribution was realising Newton's ideas in the language of modern mathematics, now called Lagrangian mechanics.

After Newton, classical mechanics became a principal field of study in mathematics as well as physics. More abstract and generalized mathematical treatments progressively allowed finding solutions to a far greater number of problems. An important reformulation was made in 1788 by Joseph Louis Lagrange. Lagrangian mechanics was in turn refactored in 1833 by William Rowan Hamilton.

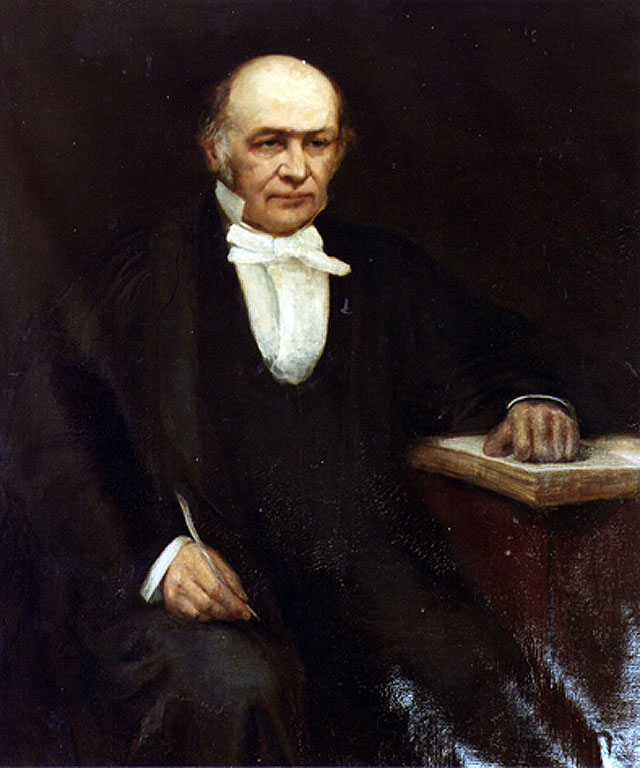
Hamilton developed an alternative to Lagrangian mechanics now called Hamiltonian mechanics.

Some difficulties in classical mechanics were discovered in the late 19th century that could only be resolved by revisions to physics. One of the issues related to compatibility with electromagnetic theory, and the famous Michelson–Morley experiment. The resolution of these problems led to the special theory of relativity, which is sometimes included within "classical" physics, but also sometimes said to be incommensurable with it. This theory can be viewed as an extension to the laws of physics that, together with general relativity, completes classical mechanics.

A second issue was related to thermodynamics. When combined with thermodynamics, classical mechanics leads to the Gibbs paradox of classical statistical mechanics, in which entropy is not a well-defined quantity. Black-body radiation was not explained without the introduction of quanta. As experiments reached the atomic level, classical mechanics failed to explain, even approximately, such basic things as the energy levels and sizes of atoms and the photo-electric effect. The effort at resolving these problems led to the development of quantum mechanics.

Since the end of the 20th century, classical mechanics in physics has no longer been an independent theory. Instead, classical mechanics is now considered an approximate theory to the more general quantum mechanics. Emphasis has shifted to understanding the fundamental forces of nature as in the Standard Model and its more modern extensions into a unified theory of everything. Classical mechanics is a theory useful for the study of the motion of non-quantum mechanical, low-energy particles in weak gravitational fields.

== See also ==
- Dynamical system
- List of equations in classical mechanics
- List of publications in classical mechanics
- List of textbooks on classical mechanics and quantum mechanics
- Molecular dynamics
- Newton's laws of motion
- Special relativity
- Quantum mechanics
- Quantum field theory
