= Transmission loss (duct acoustics) =

Sound measurements
- Characteristic: Symbols
- Sound pressure: p, SPL, L_{PA}
- Particle velocity: v, SVL
- Particle displacement: δ
- Sound intensity: I, SIL
- Sound power: P, SWL, L_{WA}
- Sound energy: W
- Sound energy density: w
- Sound exposure: E, SEL
- Acoustic impedance: Z
- Audio frequency: AF
- Transmission loss: TL

Transmission loss (TL) in duct acoustics describes the acoustic performances of a muffler-like system. It is frequently used in the industry areas such as muffler manufacturers and NVH (noise, vibration and harshness) department of automobile manufacturers, and in academic studies. Generally, the higher transmission loss a system has, the better it will perform in terms of noise cancellation.

== Introduction ==
Transmission loss (TL) in duct acoustics is defined as the difference between the power incident on a duct acoustic device (muffler) and that transmitted downstream into an anechoic termination. Transmission loss is independent of the source, if only plane waves are incident at the inlet of the device. Transmission loss does not involve the radiation impedance inasmuch as it represents the difference between incident acoustic energy and that transmitted into an anechoic environment. Being made independent of the terminations, TL finds favor with researchers who are sometimes interested in finding the acoustic transmission behavior of an element or a set of elements in isolation of the terminations. But measurement of the incident wave in a standing wave acoustic field requires uses of impedance tube technology, may be quite laborious, unless one makes use of the two-microphone method with modern instrumentation.

== Mathematical definition ==
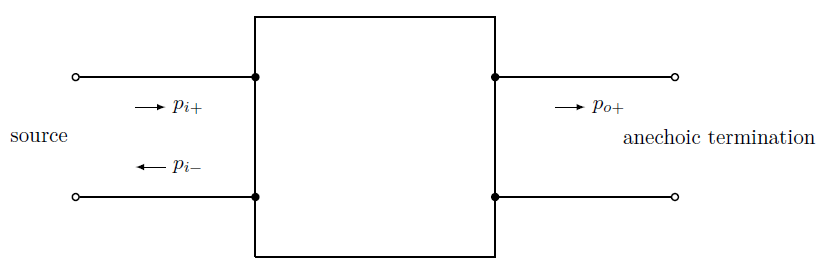
Transmission loss (duct acoustics) definition illustration.

By definition the plane wave TL on an acoustic component with negligible mean flow may be described as:

$$TL = L_{Wi} - L_{Wo} = 10 \log_{10} \left\vert {S_i p_{i+} v_{i+} \over 2} {2\over S_o p_o v_0 }\right\vert = 10 \log_{10} \left\vert {S_i p_{i+}^2 \over S_o p_o^2 }\right\vert$$

where:

- $L_{Wi}$ is the incident sound power in the inlet coming towards muffler;
- $L_{Wo}$ is the transmitted sound power going downstream in the outlet out of the muffler;
- $S_i, S_o$ stand for the cross-sectional area of the inlet and outlet of muffler;
- $p_{i+}$ is the acoustic pressure of the incident wave in the inlet, towards muffler;
- $p_o$ is the acoustic pressure of the transmitted wave in the outlet, away from muffler.
- $v_{i+}$ is the particle velocity of the incident wave in the inlet, towards muffler;
- $v_o$ is the particle velocity of the transmitted wave in the outlet, away from muffler.

Note that $p_{i+}$ cannot be measured directly in isolation from the reflected wave pressure $p_{i-}$ (in the inlet, away from muffler). One has to resort to impedance tube technology or two-microphone method with modern instrumentation. However at the downstream side of the muffler, $p_o = p_{o+}$ in view of the anechoic termination, which ensures $p_{o-} = 0$.

And in most muffler applications, Si and So, the area of the exhaust pipe and tail pipe, are generally made equal, thus we have:

$$TL = 20 \log_{10} \left\vert {p_{i+} \over p_o}\right\vert$$

Thus, TL equals 20 times the logarithm (to the base 10) of the ratio of the acoustic pressure associated with the incident wave (in the exhaust pipe) and that of the transmitted wave (in the tail pipe), with the two pipes having the same cross-sectional area and the tail pipe terminating anechoically. However this anechoic condition is normally difficult to meet under practical industry environment, thus it is usually more convenient for the muffler manufacturers to measure insertions loss during their muffler performance tests under working conditions (mounted on an engine). However, there is no relationship between the insertion loss and the transmission loss of a muffler.

Also, since the transmitted sound power cannot possibly exceed the incident sound power (or $\left\vert p_{i+}\right\vert$ is always larger than $\left\vert p_{o}\right\vert$), it is known that TL will never be less than 0 dB.

If the system contains non-negligible mean flow and have duct sizes which support wave modes of orders higher than the plane wave mode at the frequencies of interest, transmission loss calculations are modified accordingly.

Transmission matrix description

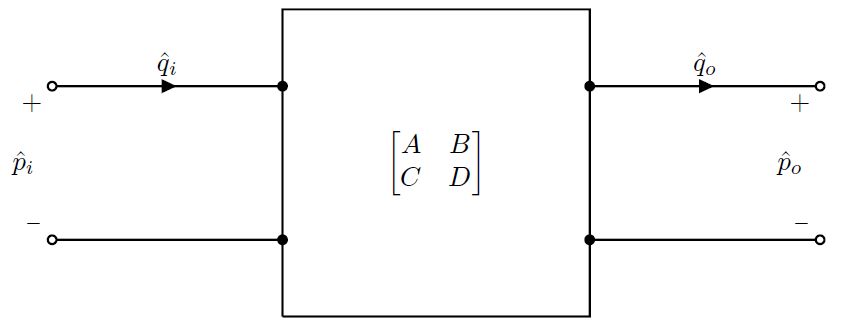
Transmission loss (duct acoustics) definition illustration with transmission matrix.

The low-frequency approximation implies that each subsystem is an acoustic two-port (or four-pole system) with two (and only two) unknown parameters, the complex amplitudes of two interfering waves travelling in opposite directions. Such a system can be described by its transmission matrix (or four-pole matrix), as follows

$$\begin{bmatrix}
\hat p_i \\
\hat q_i
\end{bmatrix}
=
\begin{bmatrix}
A & B \\
C & D
\end{bmatrix}
\begin{bmatrix}
\hat p_o \\
\hat q_o
\end{bmatrix}$$,

where $\hat p_i$,$\hat p_o$,$\hat q_i$ and $\hat q_o$ are the sound pressures and volume velocities at the input and at the output. A, B, C and D are complex numbers. With this representation it can be proved that the transmission loss (TL) of this subsystem can be calculated as,

$$TL = 10 \log_{10}\left( {{1 \over 4} \left\vert { A + B {S \over \rho c} + C { \rho c \over S} + D }\right\vert^2}\right )$$,

where:

- $S$ is inlet and outlet cross-sectional area;
- $\rho c$ are media density and sound velocity.

== A simple example ==
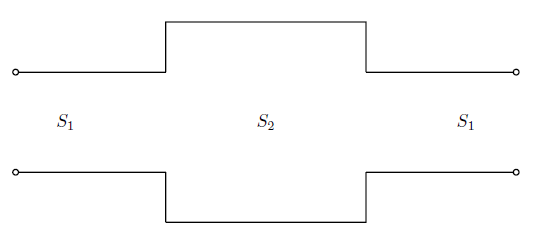
Transmission loss (duct acoustics) calculation - a simple example (one chamber silencer).

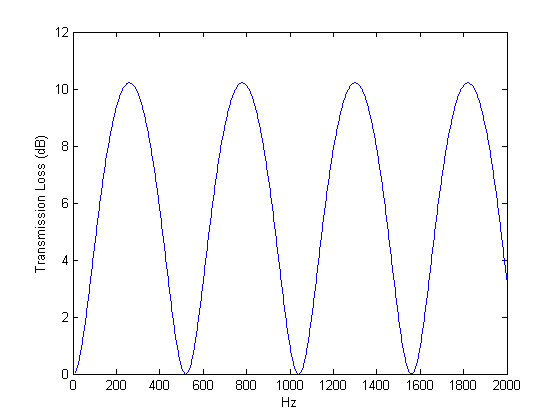
Result of transmission loss (duct acoustics) calculation - a simple example (one chamber silencer). c=520m/s at 400°C; l=0.5m; h=1/3.

Considering we have the simplest reactive silencer with only one expansion chamber (length l and cross-sectional area S2), with inlet and outlet both having cross-sectional area S1). As we know the transmission matrix of a tube (in this case, the expansion chamber) is

$$\begin{bmatrix}
A & B \\
C & D
\end{bmatrix}
=
\begin{bmatrix}
{\cos kl} & {j {\rho c \over S_2} \sin kl}\\
{j {S_2\over \rho c} \sin kl} & {\cos kl}
\end{bmatrix}$$.

Substitute to the equation of TL above, it can be seen that the TL of this simple reactive silencer is

$$\begin{align} TL & = 10 \log_{10}\left (  {{1 \over 4} \left\vert { {\cos kl} + {j {S_1 \over S_2} \sin kl} + {j {S_2\over S_1} \sin kl} + {\cos kl} }\right\vert^2} \right ) \\
& = 10 \log_{10}\left ({{\cos^2 kl} +{1 \over 4} \left (h + {1 \over h}\right )^2 {\sin^2 kl}}\right ) \\
& = 10 \log_{10}\left ({1 +{1 \over 4} \left (h - {1 \over h}\right )^2 {\sin^2 kl}}\right ),
\end{align}$$

where $h$ is the ratio of the cross-sectional areas and $l$ is the length of the chamber. $k=\omega / c$ is the wave number while $c$ is the sound speed. Note that the transmission loss is zero when $l$ is a multiple of half a wavelength.

As a simple example, consider a one chamber silencer with h=S1/S2=1/3, at around 400 °C the sound speed is about 520 m/s, with l=0.5 m, one easily calculate the TL result shown on the plot on the right. Note that the TL equals zero when frequency is a multiple of $c \over {2 l}$ and TL peaks when frequency is ${c \over {4 l}} + {n * {c \over {2 l}}}$.

Also note that the above calculation is only valid for low-frequency range because at low-frequency range the sound wave can be treated as a plane wave. The TL calculation will start losing its accuracy when the frequency goes above the cutoff frequency, which can be calculated as $f_c = 1.84 {c \over {\pi D}}$, where D is diameter of the largest pipe in the structure. In the case above, if for example the muffler body has a diameter of 300mm, then the cut-off frequency is then 1.84*520/pi/0.3=1015 Hz.
