= Figure of merit =

Numeric statement of performance

A figure of merit (FOM) is a performance metric that characterizes the performance of a device, system, or method, relative to its alternatives.

== Examples ==
- Absolute alcohol content per currency unit in an alcoholic beverage
- Accuracy of a rifle
- Audio amplifier figures of merit such as gain or efficiency
- Battery life of a laptop computer
- Calories per serving
- Clock rate of a CPU is often given as a figure of merit, but is of limited use in comparing between different architectures. FLOPS may be a better figure, though these too are not completely representative of the performance of a CPU.
- Contrast ratio of an LCD
- Frequency response of a speaker
- Fill factor of a solar cell
- Resolution of the image sensor in a digital camera
- Measure of the detection performance of a sonar system, defined as the propagation loss for which a 50% detection probability is achieved
- Noise figure of a radio receiver
- The thermoelectric figure of merit, zT, a material constant proportional to the efficiency of a thermoelectric couple made with the material
- The figure of merit of digital-to-analog converter, calculated as (power dissipation)/(2^{ENOB} × effective bandwidth) [J/Hz]
- Luminous efficacy of lighting
- Profit of a company
- Residual noise remaining after compensation in an aeromagnetic survey
- Heat absorption and transfer quality for a solar cooker
- Performance of transparent conducting thin-film materials, such as FTO, calculated as (transparency)^{10}/(surface resistivity)

Computational benchmarks are synthetic figures of merit that summarize the speed of algorithms or computers in performing various typical tasks.
