= Liquid sound =

Liquid Sound is a method of attaining underwater sound reproduction of music or meditative sonorities in swimming pools, combined with lighting effects. It is also an official trademark belonging to its inventor Micky Remann, a writer and musician living in Frankfurt am Main.

== Micky Remann ==
Remann (born 1951 in Löhne-Menninghüffen) studied German Literature, obtaining his master's degree with a thesis on Paul Scheerbart. In the early 1980s, he was "en route outside of Europe for a long time as a musician, writer, and 'world view traveler.'" Besides articles in Pflasterstrand and Kursbuch, he published the books "Der Globaltrottel", ("The Global Idiot,") "Solarperlexus" ("Solarpearlexus"), and "Ozeandertaler" ("Oceandertaler"). For many years, Remann was the German voice of the magician David Copperfield at his live performances. Today, he is active as a media artist and as the curator of such events and projects as underwater concerts and the "Apoldaer Weltglockengeläut" ("Sounds of the World's Bells in Apolda"). Since 2004, Remann has been an Instructor of Media Art and Media Designing at the Bauhaus-Universität Weimar (Bauhaus University of Weimar).

== History ==
Remann performed initial experiments with light and sound technology in 1986 at the so-called "Frankfurt Underwater Concert" in what was at that time the Central Municipal Indoor Swimming Pool (today, the "Wave" in the Hilton Hotel in Frankfurt) as an artistic performance. One of the participating musicians, among others, was Alfred Harth. This underwater concert won Remann an entry in the Guinness Book of Records.

In 2000, Liquid Sound was one of the registered world projects at the Expo 2000 in Hanover.

== Applications ==
"Liquid Sound", a computer-controlled multimedia system utilizing light above and sound under water, was first introduced in the early 1990s in a few floating facilities in Germany and Austria.

In the Thuringian spa of Bad Sulza, Remann further developed his conceptional and technical know-how. The first stationary installation of Liquid Sound equipment was then inaugurated on November 9, 1993, in the therapeutic pool of the Bad Sulza Clinical Center and served as the basis for all of the subsequent installations.

The name was not familiarized, however, until after 1993, through intensive advertising and marketing in the three so-called "Toscana Hot Springs" in Bad Sulza, Bad Schandau, and Bad Orb; there are similar facilities in Bad Nauheim and Berlin. Since then, numerous wellness hotels in Germany, Austria, South Tyrol, and on the Costa del Sol in Spain have been offering Liquid Sound pools with various sizes and forms.

Mute and motionless, the bathers lie stretched out in a pool of concentrated warm salt water, looking up into a cupola with alternating light displays and listening to underwater music of various styles such as classical and jazz; further sound experiments have been added with musicians and DJ's belonging to the so-called "Liquid Sound Clubs" close to Remann. Live concerts are also carried out on certain dates such as nights when the moon is full.

The esoteric concept on which this is based is controversial. In the northern Pacific in 1985, Remann had performed communication experiments with orcas and sought methods of sharing these whale songs with human beings in search of sources of energy underwater. The result was a sophisticated technology with underwater loudspeakers, digital light sets, amplifiers, and mixing consoles in hot springs facilities, the economic success of which is documented by the rising number of visitors to the spas.

For Liquid Sound, for instance, a special stereo set is necessary because one hears differently underwater than in the air: it is impossible to hear from where the tones are coming. The reason is that sound waves go through water about five times as fast as through the air. Due to its higher speed, the sound seems to be coming from everywhere.

"Liquid Sound combines the knowledge of modern medicine: relaxation techniques, mind technology, balneotherapy, with art (music and architecture), and bathing pleasure (whirlpools, steambaths, sauna landscapes, inhaling, sun parlors, restaurants, etc.)"

However, no therapeutic benefits have as yet been proven.

== Literature ==
- Ulrich Holbein: Zwischen Liquid Sound, Spiritualität und Zwerchfellatio. Über den Globaltrottel und Ozeanosophen Micky Remann. "Between Liquid Sound, Spirituality, and Diaphragm Fellatio. On the Global Idiot and Oceanosopher Micky Remann." Werner Pieper, 2000 ISBN 978-3-922708-10-0
