= Fisheries acoustics =

Use of acoustic sensors for aquatic life

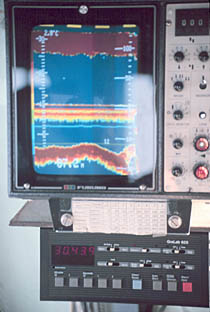
Fishfinder sonar

Fisheries acoustics includes a range of research and practical application topics using acoustical devices as sensors in aquatic environments. Acoustical techniques can be applied to sensing aquatic animals, zooplankton, and physical and biological habitat characteristics.

== Basic Theory ==
Biomass estimation is a method of detecting and quantifying fish and other marine organisms using sonar technology. An acoustic transducer emits a brief, focused pulse of sound into the water. If the sound encounters objects that are of different density than the surrounding medium, such as fish, they reflect some sound back toward the source. These echoes provide information on fish size, location, and abundance. The basic components of the scientific echo sounder hardware function is to transmit the sound, receive, filter and amplify, record, and analyze the echoes. While there are many manufacturers of commercially available "fish-finders," quantitative analysis requires that measurements be made with calibrated echo sounder equipment, having high signal-to-noise ratios.

== History ==
An extremely wide variety of fish taxa produce sound. Sound production behavior provides an opportunity to study various aspects of fish biology, such as spawning behavior and habitat selection, in a noninvasive manner. Passive acoustic methods can be an attractive alternative or supplement to traditional fisheries assessment techniques because they are noninvasive, can be conducted at low cost, and can cover a large study area at high spatial and temporal resolution.

Following the First World War, when sonar was first used for the detection of submarines, echo sounders began to find uses outside the military. The French explorer Rallier du Baty reported unexpected midwater echoes, which he attributed to fish schools, in 1927. In 1929, the Japanese scientist Kimura reported disruptions in a continuous acoustic beam by sea bream swimming in an aquaculture pond.

In the early 1930s, two commercial fishermen, Ronald Balls, an Englishman, and Reinert Bokn, a Norwegian, began independently experimenting with echosounders as a means to locate fish. Acoustic traces of sprat schools recorded by Bokn in Frafjord, Norway was the first echogram of fish to be published. In 1935, Norwegian scientist Oscar Sund reported observations of cod schools from the research vessel Johan Hjort, marking the first use of echosounding for fisheries research.

Sonar technologies developed rapidly during the Second World War, and military surplus equipment was adopted by commercial fishers and scientists soon after the end of hostilities. This period saw the first development of instruments designed specifically to detect fish. Large uncertainties persisted in the interpretation of acoustic surveys, however: calibration of instruments was irregular and imprecise, and the sound-scattering properties of fish and other organisms was poorly understood. Beginning in the 1970s and 80s, a series of practical and theoretical investigations began to overcome these limitations. Technological advances such as split-beam echosounders, digital signal processing, and electronic displays also appeared in this period.

At present, acoustic surveys are used in the assessment and management of many fisheries worldwide. Calibrated, split-beam echosounders are the standard equipment. Several acoustic frequencies are often used simultaneously, allowing some discrimination of different types of animals. Technological development continues, including research into multibeam, broadband, and parametric sonars.

== Techniques ==
=== Fish counting ===
When individual targets are spaced far enough apart that they can be distinguished from one another, it is straightforward to estimate the number of fish by counting the number of targets. This type of analysis is called echo counting, and was historically the first to be used for biomass estimation.

=== Echo integration ===
If more than one target is located in the acoustic beam at the same depth, it is not usually possible to resolve them separately. This is often the case with schooling fish or aggregations of zooplankton. In these cases, echo integration is used to estimate biomass. Echo integration assumes that the total acoustic energy scattered by a group of targets is the sum of the energy scattered by each individual target. This assumption holds well in most cases. The total acoustic energy backscattered by the school or aggregation is integrated together, and this total is divided by the (previously determined) backscattering coefficient of a single animal, giving an estimate of the total number.

== Instruments ==
=== Echosounders ===
The primary tool in fisheries acoustics is the scientific echosounder. This instrument operates on the same principles as a recreational or commercial fishfinder or echosounder, but is engineered for greater accuracy and precision, allowing quantitative biomass estimates to be made. In an echosounder, a transceiver generates a short pulse which is sent into the water by the transducer, an array of piezoelectric elements arranged to produce a focused beam of sound. In order to be used for quantitative work, the echosounder must be calibrated in the same configuration and environment in which it will be used; this is typically done by examining echoes from a metal sphere with known acoustic properties.

Early echosounders only transmitted a single beam of sound. Because of the acoustic beam pattern, identical targets at different azimuth angles will return different echo levels. If the beam pattern and angle to the target are known, this directivity can be compensated for. The need to determine the angle to a target led to the development of the twin-beam echosounder, which forms two acoustic beams, one inside the other. By comparing the phase difference of the same echo in the inner and outer beams, the angle off-axis can be estimated. In a further refinement of this concept, a split-beam echosounder divides the transducer face into four quadrants, allowing the location of targets in three dimensions. Single-frequency, split-beam echosounders are now the standard instrument of fisheries acoustics.

=== Multibeam echosounders ===
Multibeam sonars project a fan-shaped set of sound beams outward into the water and record echoes in each beam. These have been widely used in bathymetric surveys, but have recently begun to find use in fisheries acoustics as well. Their major advantage is the addition of a second dimension to the narrow water column profile given by an echosounder. Multiple pings can thus be combined to give a three-dimensional picture of animal distributions.

=== Acoustic cameras ===
Acoustic cameras are instruments that image a three-dimensional volume of water instantaneously. These typically use higher-frequency sound than traditional echosounders. This increases their resolution so that individual objects can be seen in detail, but means that their range is limited to tens of meters. They can be very useful for studying fish behavior in enclosed and/or murky bodies of water, for instance monitoring the passage of anadromous fish at dams

== Platforms for fisheries acoustics ==
Fisheries acoustic research is conducted from a variety of platforms. The most common is a traditional research vessel, with the echosounders mounted on the ship's hull or in a drop keel. If the vessel does not have permanently installed echosounders, they may be deployed on a pole mount attached to the ship's side, or on a towed body or "towfish" pulled behind or alongside the vessel. Towed bodies are particularly useful for studies of deep-living fish, such as the orange roughy, which typically live below the range of an echosounder at the surface.

In addition to research vessels, acoustic data may be collected from a variety of "ships of opportunity" such as fishing vessels, ferries, and cargo ships. Ships of opportunity can offer low-cost data collection over large areas, though the lack of a true survey design may make analysis of these data difficult. In recent years, acoustic instruments have also been deployed on remotely operated vehicles and autonomous underwater vehicles, as well as at ocean observatories.

== Target strength observations and modelling ==
Target strength (TS) is a measurement of how well a fish, zooplankter, or other target scatters sound back towards the transducer. In general, larger animals have larger target strengths, though other factors, such as the presence or absence of a gas-filled swimbladder in fishes, may have a much larger effect. Target strength is of critical importance in fisheries acoustics, since it provides a link between acoustic backscatter and animal biomass. TS can be derived theoretically for simple targets such as spheres and cylinders, but in practice, it is usually measured empirically or calculated with numerical models.

In the use of scientific echosounders for biomass estimation, calibration of the echosounder is necessary, as the target strength provides an estimate of animal biomass, which in turn may be used for stock estimation and regulation of fisheries. This is normally done using objects of known frequency response, known as calibration spheres. They may be made of copper or tungsten carbide, and are of a specific size according to desired backscatter and frequency response. They are attached with a thin monofilament fishing line, strong enough to hold the sphere but thin enough to reduce unwanted backscatter. By moving the sphere inside of the acoustic beam of a given transducer, the echosounder software will correct the observed target strength over the area of the transducer. This is repeated for all transducers and pulse shapes as required.

== Applications ==
Surveys, stock assessment, management Ecology Behavior

== See also ==
- Deep scattering layer
