= Passive acoustics =

Passive acoustics is the action of listening for sounds, often at specific frequencies or for purposes of specific analyses. It is often used for passive acoustic monitoring (PAM), the act of recording animal and environmental sounds through the use of acoustic sensors for the purpose of tracking animals and answering other ecological questions.

PAM has risen as a valuable method for a variety of queries relating to conservation, applied and behavioral ecology, and biodiversity. There are a variety of tools and machinery available for monitoring in both terrestrial and aquatic environments. This method of ecological monitoring is especially valuable for species that vocalize and are hard to observe visually. Passive acoustic monitoring also allows for observation across spatial and temporal scales previously unseen due to the limitations of data collection.

As applied to underwater acoustics, also termed hydroacoustics, passive acoustics can be used to listen for underwater explosions, earthquakes, volcanic eruptions, sounds produced by fish and other marine animals, vessel activity or aquatic detecting equipment (as in hydroacoustics to track fish).
