= High-frequency approximation =

A high-frequency approximation (or "high energy approximation") for scattering or other wave propagation problems, in physics or engineering, is an approximation whose accuracy increases with the size of features on the scatterer or medium relative to the wavelength of the scattered particles.

Classical mechanics and geometric optics are the most common and extreme high frequency approximation, where the wave or field properties of, respectively, quantum mechanics and electromagnetism are neglected entirely.

Less extreme approximations include, the WKB approximation, physical optics, the geometric theory of diffraction, the uniform theory of diffraction, and the physical theory of diffraction. When these are used to approximate quantum mechanics, they are called semiclassical approximations.

== See also ==
- Electromagnetic modeling
