= Propagation loss =

In underwater acoustics, propagation loss is a measure of the reduction in sound intensity as the sound propagates away from an underwater sound source. It is defined as the difference between the source level and the received sound pressure level.
