= Target strength =

Measure of the reflection coefficient of a sonar target

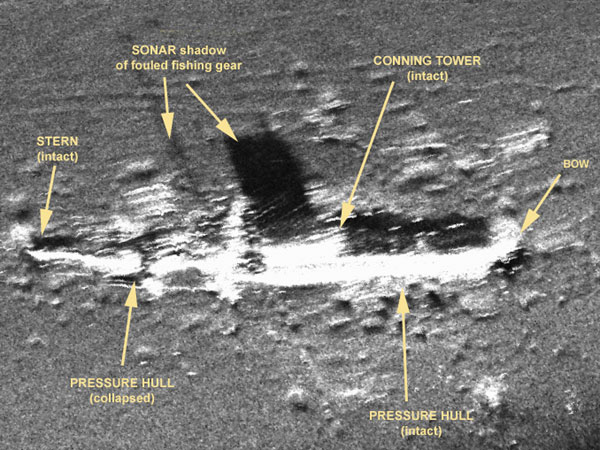
Sonar image of the wreck of USS O-9.

The target strength is a logarithmic measure of the area of a sonar target. It is typically used to quantify acoustical size of fish, marine mammals, mines or submarines and is expressed in units of decibels. For fish such as salmon, the target size varies with the length of the fish and a 5 cm fish could have a target strength of about -50 dB.

The target strength of a fish also depends on the orientation of the fish at the moment of sonification, which in turn changes the scattering cross-section of the fish and any air-filled cavities of the fish. The effect of this means that behavioral reaction affects observed biomass, for example fish evading the research vessel at night due to strong lights and vibrations from the hull and machinery. Target strength is often observed on or near a specific frequency where the target is most resonant. Narrowband (CW) pulses have historically been used, but there is ongoing research into using wideband (FM) pulses for improved classification.

== Formula ==
For some simple shapes, target strength can be derived mathematically. For other objects like fish, where the size of the air bladder is the main factor, target strength is commonly derived empirically.

Target strength (TS) is referenced to 1 meter from the acoustic center of the target, assuming isotropic reflection:

$TS=10 \cdot \log \left ( \frac{I_r}{I_i} \right ) dB = 10 \cdot \log \left [ \frac{\sigma}{4\pi} \right ] dB$

Where:

$I_r$ is the reflected intensity from target

$I_i$ is the incident intensity on target

$\sigma$ is the backscattering cross-section

Target strength of a sphere with radius $a$, large compared to the wavelength, assuming reference distance 1 meter:

$\sigma = \pi \cdot a ^ 2$

$TS = 10 \cdot \log \left [ \frac{\sigma}{4\pi} \right ] dB = 10 \cdot \log \left [ \frac{ a ^ 2 }{ 4 } \right ] dB$

Thus, for a sphere of radius 2 meters, the target strength is 0 dB.

NOAA has a calculator that can be used to inspect the target strength of calibration spheres made out of copper or tungsten carbide in relation to physical parameters found in the ocean.
