= Orthonormal basis =

Specific linear basis (mathematics)

In mathematics, particularly linear algebra, an orthonormal basis for an inner product space $V$ with finite dimension is a basis for $V$ whose vectors are orthonormal, that is, they are all unit vectors and orthogonal to each other. For example, the standard basis for a Euclidean space $\R^n$ is an orthonormal basis, where the relevant inner product is the dot product of vectors. The image of the standard basis under a rotation or reflection (or any orthogonal transformation) is also orthonormal, and every orthonormal basis for $\R^n$ arises in this fashion. An orthonormal basis can be derived from an orthogonal basis via normalization. The choice of an origin and an orthonormal basis forms a coordinate frame known as an orthonormal frame.

For a general inner product space $V,$ an orthonormal basis can be used to define normalized orthogonal coordinates on $V.$ Under these coordinates, the inner product becomes a dot product of vectors. Thus the presence of an orthonormal basis reduces the study of a finite-dimensional inner product space to the study of $\R^n$ under the dot product. Every finite-dimensional inner product space has an orthonormal basis, which may be obtained from an arbitrary basis using the Gram–Schmidt process.

In functional analysis, the concept of an orthonormal basis can be generalized to arbitrary (infinite-dimensional) inner product spaces. Given a pre-Hilbert space $H,$ an orthonormal basis for $H$ is an orthonormal set of vectors with the property that every vector in $H$ can be written as an infinite linear combination of the vectors in the basis. In this case, the orthonormal basis is sometimes called a Hilbert basis for $H.$ Note that an orthonormal basis in this sense is not generally a Hamel basis, since infinite linear combinations are required. Specifically, the linear span of the basis must be dense in $H,$ although not necessarily the entire space.

If we go on to Hilbert spaces, a non-orthonormal set of vectors having the same linear span as an orthonormal basis may not be a basis at all. For instance, any square-integrable function on the interval $[-1,1]$ can be expressed (almost everywhere) as an infinite sum of Legendre polynomials (an orthonormal basis), but not necessarily as an infinite sum of the monomials $x^n.$

A different generalisation is to pseudo-inner product spaces, finite-dimensional vector spaces $M$ equipped with a non-degenerate symmetric bilinear form known as the metric tensor. In such a basis, the metric takes the form $\text{diag}(+1,\cdots,+1,-1,\cdots,-1)$ with $p$ positive ones and $q$ negative ones.

== Examples ==
- For $\mathbb{R}^3$, the set of vectors
  $$\left\{ \mathbf{e_1} =
\begin{pmatrix} 1 & 0 & 0 \end{pmatrix} \ ,
\ \mathbf{e_2} =
\begin{pmatrix} 0 & 1 & 0 \end{pmatrix} \ ,
\ \mathbf{e_3} =
\begin{pmatrix} 0 & 0 & 1 \end{pmatrix}
\right\},$$
  is called the standard basis and forms an orthonormal basis of $\mathbb{R}^3$ with respect to the standard dot product. Note that both the standard basis and standard dot product rely on viewing $\mathbb{R}^3$ as the Cartesian product $\mathbb{R}\times\mathbb{R}\times\mathbb{R}$
  Proof: A straightforward computation shows that the inner products of these vectors equals zero, $\left\langle \mathbf{e_1}, \mathbf{e_2} \right\rangle = \left\langle \mathbf{e_1}, \mathbf{e_3} \right\rangle = \left\langle \mathbf{e_2}, \mathbf{e_3} \right\rangle = 0$ and that each of their magnitudes equals one, $\left\|\mathbf{e_1}\right\| = \left\|\mathbf{e_2}\right\| = \left\|\mathbf{e_3}\right\| = 1.$ This means that $\left\{\mathbf{e_1}, \mathbf{e_2}, \mathbf{e_3}\right\}$ is an orthonormal set. All vectors $(\mathbf{x}, \mathbf{y}, \mathbf{z}) \in \R^3$ can be expressed as a sum of the basis vectors scaled $(\mathbf{x},\mathbf{y},\mathbf{z}) = \mathbf{x e_1} + \mathbf{y e_2} + \mathbf{z e_3},$ so $\left\{\mathbf{e_1}, \mathbf{e_2}, \mathbf{e_3}\right\}$ spans $\R^3$ and hence must be a basis. It may also be shown that the standard basis rotated about an axis through the origin or reflected in a plane through the origin also forms an orthonormal basis of $\R^3$.
- For $\mathbb{R}^n$, the standard basis and inner product are similarly defined. Any other orthonormal basis is related to the standard basis by an orthogonal transformation in the group O(n).
- For pseudo-Euclidean space $\mathbb{R}^{p,q},$, an orthogonal basis $\{e_\mu\}$ with metric $\eta$ instead satisfies $\eta(e_\mu,e_\nu) = 0$ if $\mu\neq \nu$, $\eta(e_\mu,e_\mu) = +1$ if $1\leq\mu\leq p$, and $\eta(e_\mu,e_\mu) =-1$ if $p+1\leq\mu\leq p+q$. Any two orthonormal bases are related by a pseudo-orthogonal transformation. In the case $(p,q) = (1,3)$, these are Lorentz transformations.
- The set $\left\{f_n : n \in \Z\right\}$ with $f_n(x) = \exp(2 \pi inx),$ where $\exp$ denotes the exponential function, forms an orthonormal basis of the space of functions with finite Lebesgue integrals, $L^2([0,1]),$ with respect to the 2-norm. This is fundamental to the study of Fourier series.
- The set $\left\{e_b : b \in B\right\}$ with $e_b(c) = 1$ if $b = c$ and $e_b(c) = 0$ otherwise forms an orthonormal basis of $\ell^2(B).$
- Eigenfunctions of a Sturm–Liouville eigenproblem.
- The column vectors of an orthogonal matrix form an orthonormal set.

== Basic formula ==
If $B$ is an orthogonal basis of $H,$ then every element $x \in H$ may be written as $x = \sum_{b\in B} \frac{\langle x,b\rangle}{\lVert b\rVert^2} b.$

When $B$ is orthonormal, this simplifies to $x = \sum_{b\in B}\langle x,b\rangle b$ and the square of the norm of $x$ can be given by $\|x\|^2 = \sum_{b\in B}|\langle x,b\rangle |^2.$

Even if $B$ is uncountable, only countably many terms in this sum will be non-zero, and the expression is therefore well-defined. This sum is also called the Fourier expansion of $x,$ and the formula is usually known as Parseval's identity.

If $B$ is an orthonormal basis of $H,$ then $H$ is isomorphic to $\ell^2(B)$ in the following sense: there exists a bijective linear map $\Phi : H \to \ell^2(B)$ such that $\langle\Phi(x),\Phi(y)\rangle=\langle x,y\rangle \ \ \forall \ x, y \in H.$

== Orthonormal system ==
A set $S$ of mutually orthonormal vectors in a Hilbert space $H$ is called an orthonormal system. An orthonormal basis is an orthonormal system with the additional property that the linear span of $S$ is dense in $H$. Alternatively, the set $S$ can be regarded as either complete or incomplete with respect to $H$. That is, we can take the smallest closed linear subspace $V \subseteq H$ containing $S.$ Then $S$ will be an orthonormal basis of $V;$ which may of course be smaller than $H$ itself, being an incomplete orthonormal set, or be $H,$ when it is a complete orthonormal set.

== Existence ==
Using Zorn's lemma and the Gram–Schmidt process (or more simply well-ordering and transfinite recursion), one can show that every Hilbert space admits an orthonormal basis; furthermore, any two orthonormal bases of the same space have the same cardinality (this can be proven in a manner akin to that of the proof of the usual dimension theorem for vector spaces, with separate cases depending on whether the larger basis candidate is countable or not). A Hilbert space is separable if and only if it admits a countable orthonormal basis. (One can prove this last statement without using the axiom of choice. However, one would have to use the axiom of countable choice.)

== Choice of basis as a choice of isomorphism ==
For concreteness we discuss orthonormal bases for a real, $n$-dimensional vector space $V$ with a positive definite symmetric bilinear form $\phi=\langle\cdot,\cdot\rangle$.

One way to view an orthonormal basis with respect to $\phi$ is as a set of vectors $\mathcal{B} = \{e_i\}$, which allow us to write $v = v^ie_i \ \ \forall \ v \in V$ , and $v^i\in \mathbb{R}$ or $(v^i) \in \mathbb{R}^n$. With respect to this basis, the components of $\phi$ are particularly simple: $\phi(e_i,e_j) = \delta_{ij}$ (where $\delta_{ij}$ is the Kronecker delta).

We can now view the basis as a map $\psi_\mathcal{B}:V\rightarrow \mathbb{R}^n$ which is an isomorphism of inner product spaces: to make this more explicit we can write

$$\psi_\mathcal{B}:(V,\phi)\rightarrow (\mathbb{R}^n,\delta_{ij}).$$

Explicitly we can write $(\psi_\mathcal{B}(v))^i = e^i(v) = \phi(e_i,v)$ where $e^i$ is the dual basis element to $e_i$.

The inverse is a component map

$$C_\mathcal{B}:\mathbb{R}^n\rightarrow V, (v^i)\mapsto \sum_{i=1}^n v^ie_i.$$

These definitions make it manifest that there is a bijection

$$\{\text{Space of orthogonal bases } \mathcal{B}\}\leftrightarrow \{\text{Space of isomorphisms }V\leftrightarrow \mathbb{R}^n\}.$$

The space of isomorphisms admits actions of orthogonal groups at either the $V$ side or the $\mathbb{R}^n$ side. For concreteness we fix the isomorphisms to point in the direction $\mathbb{R}^n\rightarrow V$, and consider the space of such maps, $\text{Iso}(\mathbb{R}^n\rightarrow V)$.

This space admits a left action by the group of isometries of $V$, that is, $R\in \text{GL}(V)$ such that $\phi(\cdot,\cdot) = \phi(R\cdot,R\cdot)$, with the action given by composition: $R*C=R\circ C.$

This space also admits a right action by the group of isometries of $\mathbb{R}^n$, that is, $R_{ij} \in \text{O}(n)\subset \text{Mat}_{n\times n}(\mathbb{R})$, with the action again given by composition: $C*R_{ij} = C\circ R_{ij}$.

== As a principal homogeneous space ==
The set of orthonormal bases for $\mathbb{R}^n$ with the standard inner product is a principal homogeneous space or G-torsor for the orthogonal group $G = \text{O}(n),$ and is called the Stiefel manifold $V_n(\R^n)$ of orthonormal $n$-frames.

In other words, the space of orthonormal bases is like the orthogonal group, but without a choice of base point: given the space of orthonormal bases, there is no natural choice of orthonormal basis, but once one is given one, there is a one-to-one correspondence between bases and the orthogonal group. Concretely, a linear map is determined by where it sends a given basis: just as an invertible map can take any basis to any other basis, an orthogonal map can take any orthogonal basis to any other orthogonal basis.

The other Stiefel manifolds $V_k(\R^n)$ for $k < n$ of incomplete orthonormal bases (orthonormal $k$-frames) are still homogeneous spaces for the orthogonal group, but not principal homogeneous spaces: any $k$-frame can be taken to any other $k$-frame by an orthogonal map, but this map is not uniquely determined.

- The set of orthonormal bases for $\mathbb{R}^{p,q}$ is a G-torsor for $G = \text{O}(p,q)$.
- The set of orthonormal bases for $\mathbb{C}^n$ is a G-torsor for $G = \text{U}(n)$.
- The set of orthonormal bases for $\mathbb{C}^{p,q}$ is a G-torsor for $G = \text{U}(p,q)$.
- The set of right-handed orthonormal bases for $\mathbb{R}^n$ is a G-torsor for $G = \text{SO}(n)$

== See also ==
- Orthogonal basis – Basis for v whose vectors are mutually orthogonal
- Basis (linear algebra) – Set of vectors used to define coordinates
- Orthonormal frame – Euclidean space without distance and angles
- Schauder basis – Computational tool
- Total set – subset of a topological vector space whose linear span is dense
