= Examples of vector spaces =

This page lists some examples of vector spaces. See vector space for the definitions of terms used on this page. See also: dimension, basis.

Notation. Let F denote an arbitrary field such as the real numbers R or the complex numbers C.

== Trivial or zero vector space ==
The simplest example of a vector space is the trivial one: {0}, which contains only the zero vector (see the third axiom in the Vector space article). Both vector addition and scalar multiplication are trivial. A basis for this vector space is the empty set, so that {0} is the 0-dimensional vector space over F. Every vector space over F contains a subspace isomorphic to this one.

The zero vector space is conceptually different from the null space of a linear operator L, which is the kernel of L. (Incidentally, the null space of L is a zero space if and only if L is injective.)

== Field ==
The next simplest example is the field F itself. Vector addition is just field addition, and scalar multiplication is just field multiplication. This property can be used to prove that a field is a vector space. Any non-zero element of F serves as a basis so F is a 1-dimensional vector space over itself.

The field is a rather special vector space; in fact it is the simplest example of a commutative algebra over F. Also, F has just two subspaces: {0} and F itself.

== Coordinate space ==
Planar analytic geometry uses the coordinate space R^{2}. Depicted: description of a line as the solution set in $\vec x$ of the vector equation $\vec x \cdot \vec n = d$.

A basic example of a vector space is the following. For any positive integer n, the set of all n-tuples of elements of F forms an n-dimensional vector space over F sometimes called coordinate space and denoted F^{n}. An element of F^{n} is written

$$x = (x_1, x_2, \ldots, x_n)$$

where each x_{i} is an element of F. The operations on F^{n} are defined by

$$x + y = (x_1 + y_1, x_2 + y_2, \ldots, x_n + y_n)$$
$$\alpha x = (\alpha x_1, \alpha x_2, \ldots, \alpha x_n)$$
$$0 = (0, 0, \ldots, 0)$$
$$-x = (-x_1, -x_2, \ldots, -x_n)$$

Commonly, F is the field of real numbers, in which case we obtain real coordinate space R^{n}. The field of complex numbers gives complex coordinate space C^{n}. The a + bi form of a complex number shows that C itself is a two-dimensional real vector space with coordinates (a,b). Similarly, the quaternions and the octonions are respectively four- and eight-dimensional real vector spaces, and C^{n} is a 2n-dimensional real vector space.

The vector space F^{n} has a standard basis:

$$e_1 = (1, 0, \ldots, 0)$$
$$e_2 = (0, 1, \ldots, 0)$$
$$\vdots$$
$$e_n = (0, 0, \ldots, 1)$$

where 1 denotes the multiplicative identity in F.

== Infinite coordinate space ==
Let F^{∞} denote the space of infinite sequences of elements from F such that only finitely many elements are nonzero. That is, if we write an element of F^{∞} as

$$x = (x_1, x_2, x_3, \ldots)$$

then only a finite number of the x_{i} are nonzero (i.e., the coordinates become all zero after a certain point). Addition and scalar multiplication are given as in finite coordinate space. The dimensionality of F^{∞} is countably infinite. A standard basis consists of the vectors e_{i} which contain a 1 in the i-th slot and zeros elsewhere. This vector space is the coproduct (or direct sum) of countably many copies of the vector space F.

Note the role of the finiteness condition here. One could consider arbitrary sequences of elements in F, which also constitute a vector space with the same operations, often denoted by F^{N} - see below. F^{N} is the product of countably many copies of F.

By Zorn's lemma, F^{N} has a basis (there is no obvious basis). There are uncountably infinite elements in the basis. Since the dimensions are different, F^{N} is not isomorphic to F^{∞}. It is worth noting that F^{N} is (isomorphic to) the dual space of F^{∞}, because a linear map T from F^{∞} to F is determined uniquely by its values T(e_{i}) on the basis elements of F^{∞}, and these values can be arbitrary. Thus one sees that a vector space need not be isomorphic to its double dual if it is infinite dimensional, in contrast to the finite dimensional case.

== Product of vector spaces ==
Starting from n vector spaces, or a countably infinite collection of them, each with the same field, we can define the product space like above.

== Matrices ==
Let F^{m×n} denote the set of m×n matrices with entries in F. Then F^{m×n} is a vector space over F. Vector addition is just matrix addition and scalar multiplication is defined in the obvious way (by multiplying each entry by the same scalar). The zero vector is just the zero matrix. The dimension of F^{m×n} is mn. One possible choice of basis is the matrices with a single entry equal to 1 and all other entries 0.

When m = n the matrix is square and matrix multiplication of two such matrices produces a third. This vector space of dimension n^{2} forms an algebra over a field.

== Polynomial vector spaces ==
=== One variable ===
The set of polynomials with coefficients in F is a vector space over F, denoted F[x]. Vector addition and scalar multiplication are defined in the obvious manner. If the degree of the polynomials is unrestricted then the dimension of F[x] is countably infinite. If instead one restricts to polynomials with degree less than or equal to n, then we have a vector space with dimension n + 1.

One possible basis for F[x] is a monomial basis: the coordinates of a polynomial with respect to this basis are its coefficients, and the map sending a polynomial to the sequence of its coefficients is a linear isomorphism from F[x] to the infinite coordinate space F^{∞}.

The vector space of polynomials with real coefficients and degree less than or equal to n is often denoted by P_{n}.

=== Several variables ===
The set of polynomials in several variables with coefficients in F is vector space over F denoted F[x_{1}, x_{2}, ..., x_{r}]. Here r is the number of variables.

== Function spaces ==
See main article at Function space, especially the functional analysis section.

Let X be a non-empty arbitrary set and V an arbitrary vector space over F. The space of all functions from X to V is a vector space over F under pointwise addition and multiplication. That is, let f : X → V and g : X → V denote two functions, and let α in F. We define

$$(f + g)(x) = f(x) + g(x)$$
$$(\alpha f)(x) = \alpha f(x)$$

where the operations on the right hand side are those in V. The zero vector is given by the constant function sending everything to the zero vector in V. The space of all functions from X to V is commonly denoted V^{X}.

If X is finite and V is finite-dimensional then V^{X} has dimension |X|(dim V), otherwise the space is infinite-dimensional (uncountably so if X is infinite).

Many of the vector spaces that arise in mathematics are subspaces of some function space. We give some further examples.

=== Generalized coordinate space ===
Let X be an arbitrary set. Consider the space of all functions from X to F which vanish on all but a finite number of points in X. This space is a vector subspace of F^{X}, the space of all possible functions from X to F. To see this, note that the union of two finite sets is finite, so that the sum of two functions in this space will still vanish outside a finite set.

The space described above is commonly denoted (F^{X})_{0} and is called generalized coordinate space for the following reason. If X is the set of numbers between 1 and n then this space is easily seen to be equivalent to the coordinate space F^{n}. Likewise, if X is the set of natural numbers, N, then this space is just F^{∞}.

A canonical basis for (F^{X})_{0} is the set of functions {δ_{x} | x ∈ X} defined by

$$\delta_x(y) = \begin{cases}1 \quad x = y \\ 0 \quad x \neq y\end{cases}$$

The dimension of (F^{X})_{0} is therefore equal to the cardinality of X. In this manner we can construct a vector space of any dimension over any field. Furthermore, every vector space is isomorphic to one of this form. Any choice of basis determines an isomorphism by sending the basis onto the canonical one for (F^{X})_{0}.

Generalized coordinate space may also be understood as the direct sum of |X| copies of F (i.e. one for each point in X):

$$(\mathbf F^X)_0 = \bigoplus_{x\in X}\mathbf F.$$

The finiteness condition is built into the definition of the direct sum. Contrast this with the direct product of |X| copies of F which would give the full function space F^{X}.

=== Linear maps ===
An important example arising in the context of linear algebra itself is the vector space of linear maps. Let L(V,W) denote the set of all linear maps from V to W (both of which are vector spaces over F). Then L(V,W) is a subspace of W^{V} since it is closed under addition and scalar multiplication.

Note that L(F^{n},F^{m}) can be identified with the space of matrices F^{m×n} in a natural way. In fact, by choosing appropriate bases for finite-dimensional spaces V and W, L(V,W) can also be identified with F^{m×n}. This identification normally depends on the choice of basis.

=== Continuous functions ===
If X is some topological space, such as the unit interval [0,1], we can consider the space of all continuous functions from X to R. This is a vector subspace of R^{X} since the sum of any two continuous functions is continuous and scalar multiplication is continuous.

=== Differential equations ===
The subset of the space of all functions from R to R consisting of (sufficiently differentiable) functions that satisfy a certain differential equation is a subspace of R^{R} if the equation is linear. This is because differentiation is a linear operation, i.e., (a f + b g)′ = a f ′ + b g′, where ′ is the differentiation operator.

== Field extensions ==
Suppose K is a subfield of F (cf. field extension). Then F can be regarded as a vector space over K by restricting scalar multiplication to elements in K (vector addition is defined as normal). The dimension of this vector space, if it exists, (Note: Note that the resulting vector space may not have a basis in the absence of the axiom of choice.) is called the degree of the extension. For example, the complex numbers C form a two-dimensional vector space over the real numbers R. Likewise, the real numbers R form a vector space over the rational numbers Q which has (uncountably) infinite dimension, if a Hamel basis exists. (Note: There are models of ZF without AC in which this is not the case.)

If V is a vector space over F it may also be regarded as vector space over K. The dimensions are related by the formula

dim_{K}V = (dim_{F}V)(dim_{K}F)

For example, C^{n}, regarded as a vector space over the reals, has dimension 2n.

== Finite vector spaces ==
Apart from the trivial case of a zero-dimensional space over any field, a vector space over a field F has a finite number of elements if and only if F is a finite field and the vector space has a finite dimension. Thus we have F_{q}, the unique finite field (up to isomorphism) with q elements. Here q must be a power of a prime (q = p^{m} with p prime). Then any n-dimensional vector space V over F_{q} will have q^{n} elements. Note that the number of elements in V is also the power of a prime (because a power of a prime power is again a prime power). The primary example of such a space is the coordinate space (F_{q})^{n}.

These vector spaces are of critical importance in the representation theory of finite groups, number theory, and cryptography.
