= Dedekind-infinite set =

Set with an equinumerous proper subset

In mathematics, a set A is Dedekind-infinite (named after the German mathematician Richard Dedekind) if some proper subset B of A is equinumerous to A. Explicitly, this means that there exists a bijective function from A onto some proper subset B of A. A set is Dedekind-finite if it is not Dedekind-infinite (i.e., no such bijection exists). Proposed by Dedekind in 1888, Dedekind-infiniteness was the first definition of "infinite" that did not rely on the definition of the natural numbers.

A simple example is $\mathbb{N}$, the set of natural numbers. From Galileo's paradox, there exists a bijection that maps every natural number n to its square n^{2}. Since the set of squares is a proper subset of $\mathbb{N}$, $\mathbb{N}$ is Dedekind-infinite.

Until the foundational crisis of mathematics showed the need for a more careful treatment of set theory, most mathematicians assumed that a set is infinite if and only if it is Dedekind-infinite. In the early twentieth century, Zermelo–Fraenkel set theory, today the most commonly used form of axiomatic set theory, was proposed as an axiomatic system to formulate a theory of sets free of paradoxes such as Russell's paradox. Using the axioms of Zermelo–Fraenkel set theory with the originally highly controversial axiom of choice included (ZFC) one can show that a set is Dedekind-finite if and only if it is finite in the usual sense. However, there exists a model of Zermelo–Fraenkel set theory without the axiom of choice (ZF) in which there exists an infinite, Dedekind-finite set, showing that the axioms of ZF are not strong enough to prove that every set that is Dedekind-finite is finite. There are definitions of finiteness and infiniteness of sets besides the one given by Dedekind that do not depend on the axiom of choice.

A vaguely related notion is that of a Dedekind-finite ring.

== Comparison with the usual definition of infinite set ==
This definition of "infinite set" should be compared with the usual definition: a set $A$ is infinite when it cannot be put in bijection with a finite ordinal, namely a set of the form ${0, 1, 2, ..., n-1}$ for some natural number $n$—an infinite set is one that is literally "not finite", in the sense of bijection.

Meanwhile, a set $A$ is Dedekind-infinite if and only if it has a subset that can be put in bijection with the set of natural numbers, i.e., if and only if there exists an infinite non-repeating sequence $(a_0, a_1, a_2, \ldots)$ of its elements. (Note: If such a sequence exists, then there exists a bijection from $A$ to $A \setminus \{a_0\}$ that maps every $a_i$ to $a_{i+1}$, and every $x \in A$ not in the sequence to $x$ itself. Conversely, if there exists a bijection $f$ from $A$ to some $B \subsetneq A$, one can take any $a_0 \in A \setminus B$, and let $a_{i+1} = f(a_i)$.) It is intuitively obvious that such a sequence cannot exist if $A$ is finite in the usual sense, and indeed this can be proved rigorously by mathematical induction on the cardinality of $A$. On the other hand, when $A$ is infinite in the usual sense, it takes some (possibly weak) form of the axiom of choice (AC) to construct such an infinite sequence.

During the latter half of the 19th century, most mathematicians simply assumed that a set is infinite if and only if it is Dedekind-infinite. However, this equivalence cannot be proved with the axioms of Zermelo–Fraenkel set theory without AC (usually denoted "ZF"). The full strength of AC is not needed to prove the equivalence; in fact, the equivalence of the two definitions is strictly weaker than the axiom of countable choice (CC). (See the references below.)

== Dedekind-infinite sets in ZF ==
A set A is Dedekind-infinite if it satisfies any of the following equivalent (over ZF) conditions:

- it has a countably infinite subset;
- there exists an injective map from a countably infinite set (say, N, the set of all natural numbers) to A;
- there exists a bijection between A and some proper subset of A;
- there is a function A → A that is injective but not surjective;
- there is an injective function A ∪ {A} → A;

it is dually Dedekind-infinite if it satisfies any of the following equivalent (over ZF) conditions:

- there is a function A → A that is surjective but not injective;
- there is a surjective function A → A ∪ {A};

it is weakly Dedekind-infinite if it satisfies any of the following equivalent (over ZF) conditions:

- there exists a surjective map from A onto a countably infinite set;
- the powerset of A is Dedekind-infinite;

and it is infinite if it satisfies any of the following equivalent (over ZF) conditions:

- for all natural numbers n, there is no bijection from {0, 1, 2, ..., n−1} to A;
- the power set of A is weakly Dedekind-infinite. (Note: The power set of a finite set is finite; for the other implication, if A is infinite, map each finite subset of A to its cardinality and every infinite subset to 0, which gives a surjection from the power set of A to N that is not injective.)

Then, ZF proves the following implications: Dedekind-infinite ⇒ dually Dedekind-infinite ⇒ weakly Dedekind-infinite ⇒ infinite.

There exist models of ZF having an infinite Dedekind-finite set. Let A be such a set, and let B be the set of finite injective sequences from A. Since A is infinite, the function "drop the last element" from B to itself is surjective but not injective, so B is dually Dedekind-infinite. However, since A is Dedekind-finite, then so is B (if B had a countably infinite subset, then using the fact that the elements of B are injective sequences, one could exhibit a countably infinite subset of A).

When sets have additional structures, both kinds of infiniteness can sometimes be proved equivalent over ZF. For instance, ZF proves that a well-ordered set is Dedekind-infinite if and only if it is infinite.

== History ==
The term is named after the German mathematician Richard Dedekind, who first explicitly introduced the definition. It is notable that this definition was the first definition of "infinite" that did not rely on the definition of the natural numbers (unless one follows Poincaré and regards the notion of number as prior to even the notion of set). Although such a definition was known to Bernard Bolzano, he was prevented from publishing his work in any but the most obscure journals by the terms of his political exile from the University of Prague in 1819. Moreover, Bolzano's definition was more accurately a relation that held between two infinite sets, rather than a definition of an infinite set per se.

For a long time, many mathematicians did not even entertain the thought that there might be a distinction between the notions of infinite set and Dedekind-infinite set. In fact, the distinction was not really realised until after Ernst Zermelo formulated the AC explicitly. The existence of infinite, Dedekind-finite sets was studied by Bertrand Russell and Alfred North Whitehead in 1912; these sets were at first called mediate cardinals or Dedekind cardinals.

With the general acceptance of the axiom of choice among the mathematical community, these issues relating to infinite and Dedekind-infinite sets have become less central to most mathematicians. However, the study of Dedekind-infinite sets played an important role in the attempt to clarify the boundary between the finite and the infinite, and also an important role in the history of the AC.

== Relation to the axiom of choice ==
Since every infinite well-ordered set is Dedekind-infinite, and since the AC is equivalent to the well-ordering theorem stating that every set can be well-ordered, clearly the general AC implies that every infinite set is Dedekind-infinite. However, the equivalence of the two definitions is much weaker than the full strength of AC.

In particular, there exists a model of ZF in which there exists an infinite set with no countably infinite subset. Hence, in this model, there exists an infinite, Dedekind-finite set. By the above, such a set cannot be well-ordered in this model.

If we assume the axiom of countable choice (i. e., AC_{ω}), then it follows that every infinite set is Dedekind-infinite. However, the equivalence of these two definitions is in fact strictly weaker than even the AC_{ω}. Explicitly, there exists a model of ZF in which every infinite set is Dedekind-infinite, yet the AC_{ω} fails (assuming consistency of ZF).

== Proof of equivalence to infinity, assuming axiom of countable choice ==
That every Dedekind-infinite set is infinite can be easily proven in ZF: every finite set has by definition a bijection with some finite ordinal n, and one can prove by induction on n that this is not Dedekind-infinite.

By using the axiom of countable choice one can prove the converse, namely that every infinite set X is Dedekind-infinite, as follows:

First, define a function over the natural numbers (that is, over the finite ordinals) f : N → Power(Power(X)), so that for every natural number n, f(n) is the set of finite subsets of X of size n (i.e. that have a bijection with the finite ordinal n). f(n) is never empty, or otherwise X would be finite (as can be proven by induction on n).

The image of f is the countable set {f(n) | n ∈ N}, whose members are themselves infinite (and possibly uncountable) sets. By using the axiom of countable choice we may choose one member from each of these sets, and this member is itself a finite subset of X. More precisely, according to the axiom of countable choice, a (countable) set exists, G = {g(n) | n ∈ N}, so that for every natural number n, g(n) is a member of f(n) and is therefore a finite subset of X of size n.

Now, we define U as the union of the members of G. U is an infinite countable subset of X, and a bijection from the natural numbers to U, h : N → U, can be easily defined. We may now define a bijection B : X → X \ h(0) that takes every member not in U to itself, and takes h(n) for every natural number to h(n + 1). Hence, X is Dedekind-infinite, and we are done.

== Generalizations ==
Expressed in category-theoretical terms, a set A is Dedekind-finite if in the category of sets, every monomorphism f : A → A is an isomorphism. A von Neumann regular ring R has the analogous property in the category of (left or right) R-modules if and only if in R, xy = 1 implies yx = 1. More generally, a Dedekind-finite ring is any ring that satisfies the latter condition. Beware that a ring may be Dedekind-finite even if its underlying set is Dedekind-infinite, e.g. the integers.

== See also ==
- Amorphous set
