= Invariant basis number =

In the mathematical field of ring theory, a ring R has the invariant basis number (IBN) property if all finitely generated free modules over R have a well-defined rank. In the case of fields, the IBN property is the fact that finite-dimensional vector spaces have a unique dimension.

== Definition ==
A ring R has invariant basis number (IBN) if for all positive integers m and n, R^{m} isomorphic to R^{n} (as left R-modules) implies that m = n.

Equivalently, this means there do not exist distinct positive integers m and n such that R^{m} is isomorphic to R^{n}.

Rephrasing the definition of invariant basis number in terms of matrices, it says that, whenever A is an m-by-n matrix over R and B is an n-by-m matrix over R such that AB = I and BA = I, then m = n. This form reveals that the definition is left–right symmetric, so it makes no difference whether we define IBN in terms of left or right modules; the two definitions are equivalent.

Note that the isomorphisms in the definitions are not ring isomorphisms, they are module isomorphisms, even when one of n or m is 1.

== Properties ==
The main purpose of the invariant basis number condition is that free modules over an IBN ring satisfy an analogue of the dimension theorem for vector spaces: any two bases for a free module over an IBN ring have the same cardinality. Assuming the ultrafilter lemma (a strictly weaker form of the axiom of choice), this result is actually equivalent to the definition given here, and can be taken as an alternative definition.

The rank of a free module R^{n} over an IBN ring R is defined to be the cardinality of the exponent m of any (and therefore every) R-module R^{m} isomorphic to R^{n}. Thus the IBN property asserts that every isomorphism class of free R-modules has a unique rank. The rank is not defined for rings not satisfying IBN. For vector spaces, the rank is also called the dimension. Thus the result above is in short: the rank is uniquely defined for all free R-modules iff it is uniquely defined for finitely generated free R-modules.

== Examples ==
Any field satisfies IBN, and this amounts to the fact that finite-dimensional vector spaces have a well defined dimension. Moreover, any commutative ring (except the zero ring) satisfies IBN, as does any left-Noetherian ring and any semilocal ring.

Proof

Let A be a commutative ring and assume there exists an A-module isomorphism $f \colon A^n \to A^p$. Let $(e_1,\dots,e_n)$ the canonical basis of A^{n}, which means $e_i\in A^n$ is all zeros except a one in the i-th position. By Krull's theorem, let I a maximal proper ideal of A and $(i_1,\dots,i_n)\in I^n$. An A-module morphism means
$$f(i_1,\dots,i_n) = \sum_{k=1}^n i_k f(e_k) \in I^p$$
because I is an ideal. So f induces an A/I-module morphism $f' \colon \left(\frac{A}{I}\right)^n\to \left(\frac{A}{I}\right)^p$, that can easily be proven to be an isomorphism. Since A/I is a field, f' is an isomorphism between finite dimensional vector spaces, so n = p.

An example of a nonzero ring that does not satisfy IBN is the ring of column finite matrices $\mathbb{CFM}_\mathbb{N}(R)$, the matrices with coefficients in a ring R, with entries indexed by $\mathbb{N}\times\mathbb{N}$ and with each column having only finitely many non-zero entries. That last requirement allows us to define the product of infinite matrices MN, giving the ring structure. A left module isomorphism $\mathbb{CFM}_\mathbb{N}(R)\cong\mathbb{CFM}_\mathbb{N}(R)^2$ is given by:
$$\begin{array}{rcl} \psi : \mathbb{CFM}_\mathbb{N}(R) &\to & \mathbb{CFM}_\mathbb{N}(R)^2 \\ M &\mapsto & (\text{odd columns of } M, \text{ even columns of } M) \end{array}$$

This infinite matrix ring turns out to be isomorphic to the endomorphisms of a right free module over R of countable rank.

From this isomorphism, it is possible to show (abbreviating $\mathbb{CFM}_\mathbb{N}(R)=S$) that S ≅ S^{n} for any positive integer n, and hence S^{n} ≅ S^{m} for any two positive integers m and n. There are other examples of non-IBN rings without this property, among them Leavitt algebras.

== Other results ==
IBN is a necessary (but not sufficient) condition for a ring with no zero divisors to be embeddable in a division ring (compare field of fractions in the commutative case). See also the Ore condition.

Every nontrivial division ring or stably finite ring has invariant basis number.

Every ring satisfying the rank condition (i.e. having unbounded generating number) must have invariant basis number.

== Sources ==
- Abrams, Gene; Ánh, P. N. (2002). "Some ultramatricial algebras which arise as intersections of Leavitt algebras". Journal of Algebra and Its Applications. 1 (4): 357–363. doi:10.1142/S0219498802000227. MR 1950131.
- Hungerford, Thomas W. (1974). Algebra. Graduate Texts in Mathematics. Vol. 73 (1980 reprint ed.). New York: Springer. ISBN 978-0-387-90518-1. MR 0600654.
- Lam, T. Y. (1999). Lectures on Modules and Rings. Graduate Texts in Mathematics. Vol. 189. New York: Springer. ISBN 978-0-387-98428-5. MR 1653294.
