= Orthogonal basis =

Basis consisting of mutually orthogonal vectors

In mathematics, particularly linear algebra, an orthogonal basis for an inner product space $V$ is a basis for $V$ whose vectors are mutually orthogonal. If the vectors of an orthogonal basis are normalized, the resulting basis is an orthonormal basis.

== As coordinates ==
Any orthogonal basis can be used to define a system of orthogonal coordinates $V.$ Orthogonal (not necessarily orthonormal) bases are important due to their appearance from curvilinear orthogonal coordinates in Euclidean spaces, as well as in Riemannian and pseudo-Riemannian manifolds.

== In functional analysis ==
In functional analysis, an orthogonal basis is any basis obtained from an orthonormal basis (or Hilbert basis) using multiplication by nonzero scalars.

== Extensions ==
=== Symmetric bilinear form ===
The concept of an orthogonal basis is applicable to a vector space $V$ (over any field) equipped with a symmetric bilinear form $\langle \cdot, \cdot \rangle$, where orthogonality of two vectors $v$ and $w$ means $\langle v, w \rangle = 0$. For an orthogonal basis $\left\{e_k\right\}$:
$$\langle e_j, e_k\rangle =
\begin{cases}
q(e_k) & j = k \\
0      & j \neq k,
\end{cases}$$
where $q$ is a quadratic form associated with $\langle \cdot, \cdot \rangle:$ $q(v) = \langle v, v \rangle$ (in an inner product space, $q(v) = \Vert v \Vert^2$).

Hence for an orthogonal basis $\left\{e_k\right\}$,
$$\langle v, w \rangle = \sum_k q(e_k) v_k w_k,$$
where $v_k$ and $w_k$ are components of $v$ and $w$ in the basis.

=== Quadratic form ===
The concept of orthogonality may be extended to a vector space over any field of characteristic not 2 equipped with a quadratic form $q(v)$. Starting from the observation that, when the characteristic of the underlying field is not 2, the associated symmetric bilinear form $\langle v, w \rangle = \tfrac{1}{2}(q(v+w) - q(v) - q(w))$ allows vectors $v$ and $w$ to be defined as being orthogonal with respect to $q$ when $q(v+w) - q(v) - q(w) = 0$.

== See also ==
- Basis (linear algebra) – Set of vectors used to define coordinates
- Orthonormal basis – Specific linear basis (mathematics)
- Orthonormal frame – Euclidean space without distance and angles
- Schauder basis – Computational tool
- Total set
