= Standard basis =

Vectors whose components are all 0 except one that is 1

Every vector a in three dimensions is a linear combination of the standard basis vectors i, j, and k.

In mathematics, the standard basis (also called natural basis or canonical basis) of a coordinate vector space (such as $\mathbb{R}^n$ or $\mathbb{C}^n$) is the set of vectors, each of whose components are all zero, except one that equals 1. For example, in the case of the Euclidean plane $\mathbb{R}^2$ formed by the pairs (x, y) of real numbers, the standard basis is formed by the vectors
$$\mathbf{e}_x = (1,0),\quad \mathbf{e}_y = (0,1).$$
Similarly, the standard basis for the three-dimensional space $\mathbb{R}^3$ is formed by vectors
$$\mathbf{e}_x = (1,0,0),\quad \mathbf{e}_y = (0,1,0),\quad \mathbf{e}_z=(0,0,1).$$
Here the vector e_{x} points in the x direction, the vector e_{y} points in the y direction, and the vector e_{z} points in the z direction. There are several common notations for standard-basis vectors, including {e_{x}, e_{y}, e_{z}}, {e_{1}, e_{2}, e_{3}}, {i, j, k}, and {x, y, z}. These vectors are sometimes written with a hat to emphasize their status as unit vectors (standard unit vectors).

These vectors are a basis in the sense that any other vector can be expressed uniquely as a linear combination of these. For example, every vector v in three-dimensional space can be written uniquely as
$$v_x\,\mathbf{e}_x + v_y\,\mathbf{e}_y + v_z\,\mathbf{e}_z,$$
the scalars v_{x}, v_{y}, v_{z} being the scalar components of the vector v.

In the n-dimensional Euclidean space $\mathbb R^n$, the standard basis consists of n distinct vectors
$$\{ \mathbf{e}_i : 1\leq i\leq n\},$$
where e_{i} denotes the vector with a 1 in the ith coordinate and 0's elsewhere.

Standard bases can be defined for other vector spaces, whose definition involves coefficients, such as polynomials and matrices. In both cases, the standard basis consists of the elements of the space such that all coefficients but one are 0 and the non-zero one is 1. For polynomials, the standard basis thus consists of the monomials and is commonly called monomial basis. For matrices M_{m×n}, the standard basis consists of the m×n–matrices with exactly one non-zero entry, which is 1. For example, the standard basis for 2×2 matrices is formed by the 4 matrices
$$\begin{align}
\mathbf{e}_{11} &= \begin{pmatrix} 1 & 0 \\ 0 & 0 \end{pmatrix}, &
\mathbf{e}_{12} &= \begin{pmatrix} 0 & 1 \\ 0 & 0 \end{pmatrix}, \\
\mathbf{e}_{21} &= \begin{pmatrix} 0 & 0 \\ 1 & 0 \end{pmatrix}, &
\mathbf{e}_{22} &= \begin{pmatrix} 0 & 0 \\ 0 & 1 \end{pmatrix}.
\end{align}$$

== Properties ==
By definition, the standard basis is a sequence of orthogonal unit vectors. In other words, it is an ordered and orthonormal basis.

However, an ordered orthonormal basis is not necessarily a standard basis. For instance the two vectors representing a 30° rotation of the 2D standard basis described above, i.e.,
$$\begin{align}
v_1 &= \left( {\sqrt 3 \over 2} ,  {1 \over 2} \right) \\
v_2 &= \left( {1 \over 2} , {-\sqrt 3 \over 2} \right)
\end{align}$$
are also orthogonal unit vectors, but they are not aligned with the axes of the Cartesian coordinate system, so the basis with these vectors does not meet the definition of standard basis.

== Generalizations ==
There is a standard basis also for the ring of polynomials in n indeterminates over a field, namely the monomials.

All of the preceding are special cases of the indexed family
$${(e_i)}_{i\in I}= ( (\delta_{ij} )_{j \in I} )_{i \in I}$$
where I is any set and δ_{ij} is the Kronecker delta, equal to zero whenever i ≠ j and equal to 1 if i = j. This family is the canonical basis of the R-module (free module)
$$R^{(I)}$$
of all families
$$f=(f_i)$$
from I into a ring R, which are zero except for a finite number of indices, if we interpret 1 as 1_{R}, the unit in R.

== Other usages ==
The existence of other 'standard' bases has become a topic of interest in algebraic geometry, beginning with work of Hodge from 1943 on Grassmannians. It is now a part of representation theory called standard monomial theory. The idea of standard basis in the universal enveloping algebra of a Lie algebra is established by the Poincaré–Birkhoff–Witt theorem.

Gröbner bases are also sometimes called standard bases.

In physics, the standard basis vectors for a given Euclidean space are sometimes referred to as the versors of the axes of the corresponding Cartesian coordinate system.

== See also ==
- Canonical units
- Examples of vector spaces § Generalized coordinate space
