= Markushevich basis =

In functional analysis, a Markushevich basis (sometimes M-basis) is a biorthogonal system that is both complete and total. Completeness means that the closure of the span is all of the space.

== Definition ==
Conventionally, if the index is $i$, then it means the index set is countable. Otherwise, if the index is $\alpha$, then it means the index set is not necessarily countable.

Let $X$ be Banach space. A biorthogonal system $\{x_\alpha ; x^*_\alpha\}_{x \in \alpha}$ in $X$ is a Markushevich basis if $\{x_\alpha\}_{x \in \alpha}$ is complete (also called "fundamental"):
$$\overline{\text{span}}\{x_\alpha \} = X$$
and $\{x^*_\alpha\}_{x \in \alpha}$ is total: it separates the points of $X$. Totality is equivalently stated as $\overline{\text{span}}\{x^*_\alpha \} = X^*$ where the closure is taken under the weak-star topology.

A Markushevich basis is shrinking iff we further have $\overline{\text{span}}\{x^*_\alpha \} = X^*$ under the topology induced by the operator norm on $X^*$.

A Markushevich basis is bounded iff $\sup_\alpha \|x_\alpha \| \|x^*_\alpha\| < \infty$.

A Markushevich basis $\left\{x_n ; x_n^*\right\}_{n=1}^{\infty} \subset X \times X^*$ is strong iff $x \in \overline{\operatorname{span}}\left\{\left\langle x, x_n^*\right\rangle x_n\right\}_{n=1}^{\infty}$ for all $x \in X$.

Since $x^*_\alpha(x_\alpha) = 1$, we always have the lower bound $\|x_\alpha \| \|x^*_\alpha\| \geq 1$, and therefore $\sup_i \|x_i \| \|x^*_i\| \in [1, \infty]$.

If $\sup_\alpha \|x_\alpha \| \|x^*_\alpha\| = 1$, then we can simply scale both so that $\|x_\alpha\| = \|x^*_\alpha\| = 1$ for all $\alpha$. This special case of the Markushevich basis is called an Auerbach basis. Auerbach's lemma states that any finite-dimensional Banach space has an Auerbach basis.

== Properties ==
In a separable space, Markushevich bases exist and in great abundance. Any spanning set and separating functionals can be made into a Markushevich basis by an inductive process similar to a Gram–Schmidt process:

Theorem —Let $X$ be a separable Banach space. If $\left\{z_i\right\}_i \subset X$ satisfies $\overline{\operatorname{span}}\left\{z_i\right\}_i=X$ and $\left\{g_i\right\}_i \subset X^*$ separates points of $X$, then there is a Markushevich basis $\left\{x_i ; x^*_i\right\}$ of $X$ such that $\operatorname{span}\left\{x_i\right\}=\operatorname{span}\left\{z_i\right\}$ and $\operatorname{span}\left\{x^*_i\right\}=\operatorname{span}\left\{g_i\right\}$.

Proof
Proof

Define $x_1=z_1$ and $x^*_1=g_{k_1} / g_{k_1}\left(z_1\right)$, where $k_1 \in \mathbb{N}$ is such that $g_{k_1}\left(z_1\right) \neq 0$. Then find the smallest integer $h_2$ such that $g_{h_2} \notin \operatorname{span}\left\{x^*_1\right\}$. Define $x^*_2=g_{h_2}-g_{h_2}\left(x_1\right) x^*_1$. Find an index $k_2$ such that $x^*_2\left(z_{k_2}\right) \neq 0$, and set $x_2=\left(z_{k_2}-\right. \left.x^*_1\left(z_{k_2}\right) x_1\right) / x^*_2\left(z_{k_2}\right)$. Let $h_3$ be the smallest integer such that $z_{h_3} \notin \operatorname{span}\left\{x_1, x_2\right\}$. Put $x_3=z_{h_3}-x^*_1\left(z_{h_3}\right) x_1-x^*_2\left(z_{h_3}\right) x_2$ and $x^*_3=\left(g_{k_3}-g_{k_3}\left(x_1\right) x^*_1-g_{k_3}\left(x_2\right) x^*_2\right) / g_{k_3}\left(x_3\right)$, where $k_3$ is an index such that $g_{k_3}\left(x_3\right) \neq 0$. Continue by induction. At the step $2 n$ we construct $x^*_{2 n}$ first, at the step $2 n+1$ we start by constructing $x_{2 n+1}$. It follows that $\operatorname{span}\left\{z_i\right\}_1^n \subset \operatorname{span}\left\{x_i\right\}_1^{2 n}$ and $\operatorname{span}\left\{g_i\right\}_1^n \subset \operatorname{span}\left\{x^*_i\right\}_1^{2 n}$. Clearly $x^*_i\left(x_j\right)=\delta_{i j}$, $\operatorname{span}\left\{x_i\right\} \subset \operatorname{span}\left\{z_i\right\}$ and $\operatorname{span}\left\{x^*_i\right\} \subset \operatorname{span}\left\{g_i\right\}$.

The above construction, however, does not guarantee that the constructed basis is bounded.

It is known currently that for every separable Banach space, for any $\epsilon > 0$, there exists a Markushevich basis, such that $\sup_i \|x_i\| \|x^*_i \| < 1 + \epsilon$. However, it is an open problem whether the lower limit is reachable. That is, whether every separable Banach space has a Markushevich basis where $\|x_i \| \|x^*_i\| = 1$ for all $i$. That is, whether every separable Banach space has an Auerbach basis.

Similarly, any Markushevich basis of a closed subspace can be extended:

Theorem —Let $Z$ be a closed subspace of a separable Banach space $X$. Any Markushevich basis $\{x_i; x^*_i\}$ of $Z$ can be extended to a Markushevich basis of $X$.

Every separable Banach space admits an M-basis that is not strong. Every separable Banach space admits an M-basis that is strong.

== Examples ==
Any Markushevich basis $\{x_i ; x_i^*\}_{x \in i}$ of a separable Banach space can be converted to an unbounded Markushevich basis:
$$\begin{array}{ll}
v_{2 n-1}:=x_{2 n-1}, & v_{2 n}:=x_{2 n-1}+\frac{1}{2 n} x_{2 n} \\
v_{2 n-1}^*:=x_{2 n-1}^*-2 n x_{2 n}^*, & v_{2 n}^*:=2 n x_{2 n}^*
\end{array}$$
Every Schauder basis of a Banach space is also a Markushevich basis; the converse is not true in general. An example of a Markushevich basis that is not a Schauder basis is the sequence
$$\{e^{2 i \pi n t}\}_{n \isin \mathbb{Z}}\quad\quad\quad(\text{ordered }n=0,\pm1,\pm2,\dots)$$
in the subspace $\tilde{C}[0,1]$ of continuous functions from $[0,1]$ to the complex numbers that have equal values on the boundary, under the supremum norm. The computation of a Fourier coefficient is continuous and the span dense in $\tilde{C}[0,1]$; thus for any $f\in\tilde{C}[0,1]$, there exists a sequence
$$\sum_{|n|<N}{\alpha_{N,n}e^{2\pi int}}\to f\text{.}$$
But if $f=\sum_{n\in\mathbb{Z}}{\alpha_ne^{2\pi nit}}$, then for a fixed $n$ the coefficients $\{\alpha_{N,n}\}_N$ must converge, and there are functions for which they do not.

The sequence space $l^\infty$ admits no Markushevich basis, because it is both Grothendieck and irreflexive. But any separable space (such as $l^1$) has dual (resp. $l^\infty$) complemented in a space admitting a Markushevich basis.
