= Dedekind-finite ring =

Mathematical concept

In mathematics, a ring is said to be a Dedekind-finite ring (also called directly finite rings and Von Neumann finite rings) if ab = 1 implies ba = 1 for any two ring elements a and b. In other words, all one-sided inverses in the ring are two-sided. Numerous examples of Dedekind-finite rings include commutative rings, finite rings, and Noetherian rings.

== Definitions ==
A ring $R$ is Dedekind-finite if any of the following equivalent conditions hold:

- All one sided inverses are two sided: $xy = 1$ implies $yx = 1$.
- Each element that has a right inverse has a left inverse: For $x \in R$, if there is a $y \in R$ where $xy = 1$, then there is a $z \in R$ such that $zx = 1$.
- Capacity condition: $xy=1$, $xz=0$ implies $z=0$.
- Each element has at most one right inverse.
- Each element that has a left inverse has a right inverse.
- Dual of the capacity condition: $yx=1$, $zx=0$ implies $z=0$.
- Each element has at most one left inverse.
- Each element that has a right inverse also has a two sided inverse.

== Examples ==
- Any commutative ring is Dedekind-finite.
- Any finite ring is Dedekind-finite.
- Any matrix ring $M_n(F)$ over a commutative ring $F$ is Dedekind-finite.
- Any domain is Dedekind-finite.
- Any left/right Noetherian ring is Dedekind-finite.
- Given a group $G$, the group algebra $kG$ is Dedekind-finite.
- A Dedekind-finite ring with an idempotent $e^2=e$ implies that the corner ring $eRe$ is also Dedekind-finite.
- A ring with finitely many nilpotents is Dedekind-finite.
- A unit-regular ring is Dedekind-finite.

== Non-examples ==
A counter-example can be constructed by considering the free algebra $R\langle x,y\rangle$ (a "polynomial ring" in two non-commuting indeterminates, that is, $xy \neq yx$), where the ring $R$ has no zero divisors, being divided by the ideal $I=(xy-1)$. Then $x+I \in R\langle x,y\rangle/I$ has a right inverse but is not invertible. This illustrates that Dedekind-finite rings need not be closed under homomorpic images.

Another non-example is the endomorphism ring $\operatorname{End}(V)$ of a vector space (or free module) $V$ with a countably infinite basis $e_1,e_2,\dots$. Let $L\in\operatorname{End}(V)$ be the left shift defined by $L(e_1)=0$ and $L(e_i)=e_{i-1}$ for $i\geq2$, and let $R\in\operatorname{End}(V)$ be the right shift $R(e_i)=e_{i+1}$. Then $LR=1$, but $RL(e_1)=0$.

A matrix ring over a Dedekind-finite ring may also fail to be Dedekind-finite. For this, one can consider $R=k\langle s,t,u,v,w,x,y,z\rangle$, where $k$ is a field, let
$$A=\begin{pmatrix}s&t\\u&v\end{pmatrix}$$,
$$B=\begin{pmatrix}w&x\\y&z\end{pmatrix}$$
, and $J$ the two-sided ideal of $R$ generated by the entries of $AB-I$. Then $R/J$ is a domain, but $AB=I\ne BA$ in $M_2(R/J)$.

== Properties ==
Dedekind-finite rings are closed under subrings, direct products, and finite direct sums. This makes the class of Dedekind-finite rings a quasivariety, which can also be seen from the fact that its axioms are equations and the Horn sentence $ab=1 \implies ba=1$.

A ring is Dedekind-finite if and only if so is its opposite ring. If either a ring $R$, its polynomial ring $R[X]$ with indeterminates $X$, the free word algebra $R[\tilde{X}]$ over $X$ with coefficients in $R$, or the power series ring $R[[X]]$ are Dedekind-finite, then they all are Dedekind-finite. Letting $\text{Rad}(R)$ denote the Jacobson radical of the ring $R$, the quotient ring $R/\text{Rad}(R)$ is Dedekind-finite if and only if so is $R$, and this implies that local rings and semilocal rings are also Dedekind-finite. This extends to the fact that, given a ring $R$ and a nilpotent ideal $I$, the ring $R$ is Dedekind-finite if and only if so is the quotient ring $R/I$, and as a consequence, a ring is also Dedekind-finite if and only if the upper triangular matrices with coeffecients in the ring also form a Dedekind-finite ring.

== See also ==
- Dedekind-infinite set
- Stably finite ring
- Von Neumann regular ring
