= Stably finite ring =

In mathematics, particularly in abstract algebra, a ring R is said to be stably finite (or weakly finite) if, for all square matrices A and B of the same size with entries in R, AB = 1 implies BA = 1. This is a stronger property for a ring than having the invariant basis number (IBN) property. Namely, any nontrivial (Note: A trivial ring is stably finite but doesn't have IBN.) stably finite ring has IBN. Commutative rings, Noetherian rings and Artinian rings are stably finite. Subrings of stably finite rings and matrix rings over stably finite rings are stably finite. A ring satisfying Klein's nilpotence condition is stably finite.

== See also ==
- Dedekind-finite ring
