= Saturated family =

Concept in functional analysis

In mathematics, specifically in functional analysis, a family $\mathcal{G}$ of subsets a topological vector space (TVS) $X$ is said to be saturated if $\mathcal{G}$ contains a non-empty subset of $X$ and if for every $G \in \mathcal{G},$ the following conditions all hold:

1. $\mathcal{G}$ contains every subset of $G$;
2. the union of any finite collection of elements of $\mathcal{G}$ is an element of $\mathcal{G}$;
3. for every scalar $a,$ $\mathcal{G}$ contains $aG$;
4. the closed convex balanced hull of $G$ belongs to $\mathcal{G}.$

== Definitions ==
If $\mathcal{S}$ is any collection of subsets of $X$ then the smallest saturated family containing $\mathcal{S}$ is called the saturated hull of $\mathcal{S}.$

The family $\mathcal{G}$ is said to cover $X$ if the union $\bigcup_{G \in \mathcal{G}} G$ is equal to $X$; it is total if the linear span of this set is a dense subset of $X.$

== Examples ==
The intersection of an arbitrary family of saturated families is a saturated family. Since the power set of $X$ is saturated, any given non-empty family $\mathcal{G}$ of subsets of $X$ containing at least one non-empty set, the saturated hull of $\mathcal{G}$ is well-defined. Note that a saturated family of subsets of $X$ that covers $X$ is a bornology on $X.$

The set of all bounded subsets of a topological vector space is a saturated family.

== See also ==
- Topology of uniform convergence
- Topological vector lattice
- Vector lattice – Partially ordered vector space, ordered as a lattice
