= Auerbach's lemma =

Theorem in functional analysis

In mathematics, Auerbach's lemma, named after Herman Auerbach, is a theorem in functional analysis which asserts that a certain property of Euclidean spaces holds for general finite-dimensional normed vector spaces.

== Statement ==
Let $(V, \|\cdot\|)$ be an $n$-dimensional normed vector space. Then there exists a basis $\{e_{1}, \dots, e_{n}\}$ of $V$ such that $\|e_{i}\| = 1$ and $\|e^{i}\| = 1$ for $i = 1, \dots, n$, where $\{e^{1}, \dots, e^{n}\}$ is a basis of $V^{*}$ dual to $\{e_{1}, \dots, e_{n}\}$, i.e. $e^{i}(e_{j}) = \delta_{ij}$.

A basis with this property is called an Auerbach basis.

If $V$ is an inner product space (or even infinite-dimensional Hilbert space) then this result is obvious as one may take for $\{e_{i}\}$ any orthonormal basis of $V$ (the dual basis is then $\{(e_{i}|\cdot)\}$).

=== Geometric formulation ===
An equivalent statement is the following: any centrally symmetric convex body in $\mathbf{R}^n$ has a linear image which contains the unit cross-polytope (the unit ball for the $\ell_1^n$ norm) and is contained in the unit cube (the unit ball for the $\ell_{\infty}^n$ norm).

== Proof ==
By induction on the dimension $n$. Pick an arbitrary unit vector $e_n \in V$. Because the set of norm-1 points make up a convex symmetric body in $V$, there exists a hyperplane $P_n$ supporting $V$ at $e_n$. This is a consequence of the hyperplane separation theorem, which is a consequence of the Hahn–Banach theorem.

Now, define the dual vector $e^n \in V^*$, such that $\{x \in V : e^n(x) = 1\} = P_n$. That is, the contour surfaces of $e^n$ are parallel to $P_n$.

Then, the subspace $\ker(e^n)$ is a normed space of dimension $n-1$, and apply induction.

== Corollary ==
The lemma has a corollary with implications to approximation theory.

Let $V$ be an $n$-dimensional subspace of a normed vector space $(X,\|\cdot\|)$. Then there exists a projection $P$ of $X$ onto $V$ such that $\|P\| \le n$.

=== Proof ===
Let $\{e_{1}, \dots, e_{n}\}$ be an Auerbach basis of $V$ and $\{e^{1}, \dots, e^{n}\}$ corresponding dual basis. By the Hahn–Banach theorem each $e^{i}$ extends to $f^{i} \in X^*$ such that $\|f^{i}\| = 1$. Now set $P(x) = \sum f^{i}(x) e_{i}$. It is easy to check that $P$ is indeed a projection onto $V$ and that $\|P\| \le n$ (this follows from the triangle inequality).

== See also ==
- Markushevich basis
