= Canonical units =

A canonical unit is a unit of measurement agreed upon as default in a certain context.

== In astrodynamics ==
In astrodynamics, canonical units are defined in terms of some important object’s orbit that serves as a reference. In this system, a reference mass, for example the Sun’s, is designated as 1 “canonical mass unit” and the mean distance from the orbiting object to the reference object is considered the “canonical distance unit”.

Canonical units are useful when the precise distances and masses of objects in space are not available. Moreover, by designating the mass of some chosen central or primary object to be “1 canonical mass unit” and the mean distance of the reference object to another object in question to be “1 canonical distance unit”, many calculations can be simplified.

=== Overview ===
The Canonical Distance Unit $\; \text{[CDU]} \;$ is defined to be the mean radius of the reference orbit.

The Canonical Time Unit $\; \text{[CTU]} \;$ is defined by the gravitational parameter $\; \mu \;$:

$$\mu \equiv G \, M ~$$

where

$\; G \;$ is the gravitational constant
$\; M \equiv \text{[CMU]} \;$ is the mass of the central reference body

In canonical units, the gravitational parameter is given by:

$$\mu = 1 \, \frac{\;\text{[CDU]}^3\,}{\;\text{[CTU]}^2 ~}$$

Any triplet of numbers, $\, M \, ,$ $\, \text{[CDU]}\, ,$ and $\, \text{[CTU]}\, ,$ that satisfy the equation above is a “canonical” set.

The quantity of the time unit [CTU] can be solved in another unit system (e.g. the metric system) if the mass and radius of the central body have been determined. Using the above equation and applying dimensional analysis, set the two equations expressing $\; \mu \;$ equal to each other:

$\mu \equiv G \times M = 1 \, \frac{\;\text{[CDU]}^3\,}{\;\text{[CTU]}^2\,} ~$

The time unit ([CTU]) can be converted to another unit system for a more useful qualitative solution using the following equation:

$\text{[CTU]} = \sqrt{ \frac{ \text{[CDU]}^3 }{ G \, M } } ~$

For Earth-orbiting satellites, approximate unit conversions are as follows:

- 1 [CDU] = 6378.1 km = 20,925,524.97 ft
- 1 [CDU]/[CTU] = 7.90538 km/s = 25,936.29 ft/sec
- 1 [CTU] = 806.80415 s

=== Astronomical Unit ===
The astronomical unit (AU) is the canonical distance unit for the orbit around the Sun of the combined Earth-Moon system (based on the formerly best-known value). The corresponding time unit is the (sidereal) year)), and the mass is the total mass of the Sun (M_{☉}). (Note: Technically, the canonical mass for the Earth’s orbit would be all the mass in the Solar System inside the Earth’s orbit, so [CMU] ≡ M_{☉} + M_{Mercury} + M_{Venus} ≈ M_{☉} , but practically, only the Sun’s mass (M_{☉}) is significant, and the conventional value adopted for the astronomical unit (AU) is a little too small in any case.)

== See also ==
- Astronomical unit
- Conversion of units
