= Poincaré =

Poincaré is a French surname. Notable people with the surname include:

- Henri Poincaré (1854–1912), French physicist, mathematician and philosopher of science
- Henriette Poincaré (1858–1943), wife of Prime Minister Raymond Poincaré
- Lucien Poincaré (1862–1920), physicist, brother of Raymond and cousin of Henri
- Raymond Poincaré (1860–1934), French Prime Minister or President inter alia from 1913 to 1920, cousin of Henri

== See also ==
- List of things named after Henri Poincaré
- French submarine Henri Poincaré (Q140)
