= Amorphous set =

Infinite set not splittable into infinite sets

In set theory, an amorphous set is an infinite set that is not the disjoint union of two infinite subsets.

== Existence ==
Amorphous sets cannot exist if the axiom of choice is assumed. Fraenkel constructed a permutation model of Zermelo–Fraenkel with atoms in which the set of atoms is an amorphous set. This is already sufficient for proving the consistency of the existence of an amorphous set with Zermelo–Fraenkel set theory with atoms. After Cohen's initial work on forcing in 1963, proofs of the consistency of amorphous sets with Zermelo–Fraenkel set theory were obtained.

== Additional properties ==
Every amorphous set is Dedekind-finite, meaning that it has no bijection to a proper subset of itself. To see this, suppose that $S$ is a set that does have a bijection $f$ to a proper subset. For each natural number $i\ge 0$ define $S_i$ to be the set of elements that belong to the image of the $i$-fold composition of f with itself but not to the image of the $(i+1)$-fold composition. Then each $S_i$ is non-empty, so the union of the sets $S_i$ with even indices would be an infinite set whose complement in $S$ is also infinite, showing that $S$ cannot be amorphous. However, the converse is not necessarily true: it is consistent for there to exist infinite Dedekind-finite sets that are not amorphous.

No amorphous set can be linearly ordered. Because the image of an amorphous set is itself either amorphous or finite, it follows that every function from an amorphous set to a linearly ordered set has only a finite image.

The cofinite filter on an amorphous set is an ultrafilter. This is because the complement of each infinite subset must not be infinite, so every subset is either finite or cofinite.

== Variations ==
If $\Pi$ is a partition of an amorphous set into finite subsets, then there must be exactly one integer $n(\Pi)$ such that $\Pi$ has infinitely many subsets of size $n$. This is because, if every size was used finitely many times, or if more than one size was used infinitely many times, this information could be used to coarsen the partition and split $\Pi$ into two infinite subsets. If an amorphous set has the additional property that, for every partition $\Pi$, $n(\Pi)=1$, then it is called strictly amorphous or strongly amorphous, and if there is a finite upper bound on $n(\Pi)$ then the set is called bounded amorphous. It is consistent with ZF that amorphous sets exist and are all bounded, or that they exist and are all unbounded.
