= Function series =

Mathematical series

In calculus, a function series is a series where each of its terms is a function, not just a real or complex number.

== Examples ==
Examples of function series include ordinary power series, Laurent series, Fourier series, Liouville-Neumann series, formal power series, and Puiseux series.

== Convergence ==
There exist many types of convergence for a function series, such as uniform convergence, pointwise convergence, and convergence almost everywhere. Each type of convergence corresponds to a different metric for the space of functions that are added together in the series, and thus a different type of limit.

The Weierstrass M-test is a useful result in studying convergence of function series.

== See also ==
- Function space
