= Total set =

In functional analysis, a total set (also called a complete set) in a vector space is a set of linear functionals $T$ with the property that if a vector $x \in X$ satisfies $f(x) = 0$ for all $f \in T,$ then $x = 0$ is the zero vector.

In a more general setting, a subset $T$ of a topological vector space $X$ is a total set or fundamental set if the linear span of $T$ is dense in $X.$

== See also ==
- Kadec norm – All infinite-dimensional, separable Banach spaces are homeomorphic
- Degenerate bilinear form
- Dual system
- Topologies on spaces of linear maps
