= List of noise topics =

This is a list of noise topics.

== Engineering and physics ==
- 1/f noise
- A-weighting
- Ambient noise level
- Antenna noise temperature
- Artificial noise
- Audio noise reduction
- Audio system measurements
- Black noise
- Blue noise
- Burst noise
- Carrier-to-receiver noise density
- Channel noise level
- Circuit noise level
- Colors of noise
- Comfort noise
- Comfort noise generator
- Cosmic noise
- Crackling noise
- DBa
- DBrn
- Decibel
- Detection theory
- Dither
- Dynamic range
- Effective input noise temperature
- Environmental noise
- Equivalent noise resistance
- Equivalent pulse code modulation noise
- Errors and residuals in statistics
- Fixed pattern noise
- Flicker noise
- Gaussian noise
- Generation-recombination noise
- Image noise
- Image noise reduction
- Intermodulation noise
- Internet background noise
- ITU-R 468 noise weighting
- Jansky noise
- Johnson–Nyquist noise, Johnson noise
- Line noise
- Mode partition noise
- Neuronal noise
- Noise
  - Noise (audio)
  - Noise (economic)
  - Noise (electronic)
  - Noise (environmental)
  - Noise (physics)
  - Noise (radio)
  - Noise (video)
- Noise current
- Noise-equivalent power
- Noise figure
- Noise floor
- Noise gate
- Noise generator
- Noise level
- Noise measurement
- Noise power
- Noise print
- Noise shaping
- Noise temperature
- Noise wall
- Noise weighting
- Noisy black
- Noisy white
- Peak signal-to-noise ratio
- Perlin noise
- Phase noise
- Photon noise
- Pink noise
- Pseudonoise=pseudorandom noise
- Quantization noise
- Quantum 1/f noise
- Radio noise source
- Random noise
- Received noise power
- Red noise
- Reference noise
- Salt and pepper noise
- Shot noise
- Signal-to-noise ratio
- Statistical noise
- Stochastic resonance
- Tape hiss
- Thermal noise
- Underwater acoustics
- White noise
- White noise machine

== Environmental ==
- Acoustic noise
- Artificial noise
- Aircraft noise
- Background noise
- Impulse noise
- Industrial noise
- Noise barrier
- Noise control
- Noise health effects
- Noise pollution
- Noise regulation
- Roadway noise
- Train noise

== Noise reduction ==
- Active noise control = anti-noise
- DBX (noise reduction)
- Differential signaling
- Dolby noise reduction system
- Helicopter noise reduction
- Hush kit
- Low-noise amplifier
- Low-noise block converter
- Muffler
- Noise barrier
- Noise cancellation
- Noise-cancelling headphone
- Noise control
- Noise mitigation
- Noise reduction
- Noise regulation
- RF shielding
- Sound proofing
- Suppressor

== Music ==
- Noise in music
- Art of Noises
- Difference between music and noise
- Harsh noise
- Harsh noise wall
- List of noise musicians
- List of Japanoise artists
- Noise music
- Noise pop
- Noise rock
- Power noise

== See also ==
- DB drag racing
- List of environment topics
