= Noise (signal processing) =

In signal processing, unwanted modifications to a signal

In signal processing, noise is a general term for unwanted (and, in general, unknown) modifications that a signal may suffer during capture, storage, transmission, processing, or conversion.

Sometimes the word is also used to mean signals that are random (unpredictable) and carry no useful information; even if they are not interfering with other signals or may have been introduced intentionally, as in comfort noise.

Noise reduction, the recovery of the original signal from the noise-corrupted one, is a very common goal in the design of signal processing systems, especially filters. The mathematical limits for noise removal are set by information theory.

== Types of noise ==
Signal processing noise can be classified by its statistical properties (sometimes called the "color" of the noise) and by how it modifies the intended signal:

- Additive noise, gets added to the intended signal
  - White noise
    - Additive white Gaussian noise
  - Black noise
  - Gaussian noise
  - Pink noise or flicker noise, with 1/f power spectrum
  - Brownian noise, with 1/f^{2} power spectrum
  - Contaminated Gaussian noise, whose PDF is a linear mixture of Gaussian PDFs
  - Power-law noise
  - Cauchy noise
- Multiplicative noise, multiplies or modulates the intended signal
- Quantization error, due to conversion from continuous to discrete values
- Poisson noise, typical of signals that are rates of discrete events
- Shot noise, e.g. caused by static electricity discharge
- Transient noise, a short pulse followed by decaying oscillations
- Burst noise, powerful but only during short intervals
- Phase noise, random time shifts in a signal

== Noise in specific kinds of signals ==
Noise may arise in signals of interest to various scientific and technical fields, often with specific features:

- Noise (audio), such as "hiss" or "hum", in audio signals
  - Background noise, due to spurious sounds during signal capture
  - Comfort noise, added to voice communications to fill silent gaps
  - Electromagnetically induced noise, audible noise due to electromagnetic vibrations in systems involving electromagnetic fields
- Noise (video), such as "snow"
- Noise (radio), such as "static", in radio transmissions
- Image noise, affects images, usually digital ones
  - Salt and pepper noise or spike noise, scattered very dark or very light pixels
  - Fixed pattern noise, tied to pixel sensors
  - Shadow noise, made visible by increasing brightness or contrast
  - Speckle noise, typical of radar imaging and interferograms
  - Film grain in analog photography
  - Compression artifacts or "mosquito noise" around edges in JPEG and other formats
- Noise (electronics) in electrical signals
  - Johnson–Nyquist noise, in semiconductors
  - Quantum noise
  - Quantum 1/f noise, a disputed theory about quantum systems
  - Generation-recombination noise, in semiconductor devices
  - Oscillator phase noise, random fluctuations of the phase of an oscillator
  - Barkhausen effect or Barkhausen noise, in the strength of a ferromagnet
  - Spectral splatter or switch noise, caused by on/off transmitter switching
  - Ground noise, appearing at the ground terminal of audio equipment
- Synaptic noise, observed in neuroscience
- Neuronal noise, observed in neuroscience
- Transcriptional noise in the transcription of genes to proteins
- Cosmic noise, in radioastronomy
- Phonon noise in materials science
- Internet background noise, packets sent to unassigned or inactive IP addresses
- Fano noise, in particle detectors
- Mode partition noise in optical cables
- Seismic noise, spurious ground vibrations in seismology
- Cosmic microwave background, microwave noise left over from the Big Bang

== Measures of noise in signals ==
A long list of noise measures has been defined to measure noise in signal processing: in absolute terms, relative to some standard noise level, or relative to the desired signal level. They include:

- Dynamic range, often defined by inherent noise level
- Signal-to-noise ratio (SNR), ratio of noise power to signal power
  - Peak signal-to-noise ratio, maximum SNR in a system
  - Signal to noise ratio (imaging), for images
  - Carrier-to-noise ratio, the signal-to-noise ratio of a modulated signal
- Noise power
- Noise figure
- Noise-equivalent flux density, a measure of noise in astronomy
- Noise floor
- Noise margin, by how much a signal exceeds the noise level
- Reference noise, a reference level for electronic noise
- Noise spectral density, noise power per unit of bandwidth
- Noise temperature
- Effective input noise temperature
- Noise-equivalent power, a measure of sensitivity for photodetectors
- Relative intensity noise, in a laser beam
- Antenna noise temperature, measure of noise in telecommunications antenna
- Received noise power, noise at a telecommunications receiver
- Circuit noise level, ratio of circuit noise to some reference level
- Channel noise level, some measure of noise in a communication channel
- Noise-equivalent target, intensity of a target when the signal-to-noise level is 1
- Equivalent noise resistance, a measure of noise based on an equivalent resistor
- Carrier-to-receiver noise density, ratio of received carrier power to receiver noise
- Carrier-to-noise-density ratio,
- Spectral signal-to-noise ratio
- Antenna gain-to-noise temperature, a measure of antenna performance
- Contrast-to-noise ratio, a measure of image quality
- Noise print, statistical signature of ambient noise for its suppression
- Equivalent pulse code modulation noise, measure of noise by comparing to PCM quantization noise

== Technology for noise in signals ==
Almost every technique and device for signal processing has some connection to noise. Some random examples are:

- Noise shaping
- Antenna analyzer or noise bridge, used to measure the efficiency of antennas
- Noise gate
- Noise generator, a circuit that produces a random electrical signal
- Radio noise source used to calibrate radiotelescopes
- Friis formulas for noise in telecommunications
- Noise-domain reflectometry, uses existing signals to find cable faults
- Noise-immune cavity-enhanced optical heterodyne molecular spectroscopy

== See also ==
- Noise (electronics)
- Signal-to-noise statistic, a mathematical formula to measure the difference of two values relative to their standard deviations
