= Quantum 1/f noise =

Quantum 1/f noise is an intrinsic and fundamental part of quantum mechanics. Fighter pilots, photographers, and scientists all appreciate the higher quality of images and signals resulting from the consideration of quantum 1/f noise. Engineers have battled unwanted 1/f noise since 1925, giving it poetic names (such as flicker noise, funkelrauschen, bruit de scintillation, etc.) due to its mysterious nature. The Quantum 1/f noise theory was developed about 50 years later, describing the nature of 1/f noise, allowing it to be explained and calculated via straightforward engineering formulas. It allows for the low-noise optimization of materials, devices and systems of most high-technology applications of modern industry and science. The theory includes the conventional and coherent quantum 1/f effects (Q1/fE). Both effects are combined in a general engineering formula, and present in Q1/f noise, which is itself most of fundamental 1/f noise. The latter is defined as the result of the simultaneous presence of nonlinearity and a certain type of homogeneity in a system, and can be quantum or classical.

The conventional Q1/fE represents 1/f fluctuations caused by bremsstrahlung, decoherence and interference in the scattering of charged particles off one another, in tunneling or in any other process in solid state physics and in general.

== Other noise data sets ==
It has also recently been claimed that 1/f noise has been seen in higher ordered self constructing functions, as well as complex systems, both biological, chemical, and physical.

== The theory ==
The basic derivation of quantum 1/f was made by Peter Handel, a theoretical physicist at the University of Missouri–St. Louis, and published in Physical Review A, in August 1980.

Several hundred papers have been published by many authors on Handel's quantum theory on 1/f noise, which is a new aspect of quantum mechanics. They verified, applied, and further developed the quantum 1/f noise formulas. Aldert van der Ziel, the nestor of the electronic noise field, verified and applied it in many devices and systems, together with dozens of his PhD students. It is described in the last of his 12 books: "Noise in electronic devices and circuits" published by Wiley in 1986. He also updated and generalized many verifications, practical applications, etc., in his authoritative 1988 review "Unified Description of 1/f Noise" in Proceedings of IEEE.

== Denials of the theory ==
In 1986 and 1987, two independent groups of theorists of the field had concluded that Handel's theory explaining the quantum 1/f effect was incorrect for both physical and mathematical reasons. The groups were:

- Group-1: Theo Nieuwenhuizen, Daan Frenkel, and Nico G. van Kampen
- Group-2: Laszlo B. Kish and Peter Heszler

Shortly thereafter, an independent set of arguments showing that the "quantum 1/f noise" explanation of electronic 1/f noise was certainly incorrect was included in a standard review article on 1/f noise by Michael Weissman. Nieuwenhuizen, et al., state in the conclusion of their paper, "As the theoretical basis for Handel's quantum theory of 1/f noise appears to be lacking, we must conclude that the agreement with experiments is fortuituous" and, in this way, they are indicating that some of the published experimental results are suspicious. Though there have been attempts to answer some of the objections to Handel's theory, quantum 1/f noise is considered to be a non-existent effect by the majority of scientists that are familiar with its theory. The difficulty is that here a judgment based on fundamental science requires the knowledge of quantum electrodynamics however most of noise scientists are solid state physicists or engineers. Science citation index shows over 20 thousand papers annually with "noise" and/or "fluctuation"(s) keywords. The opinion of the above-mentioned relevant experts in the field of noise is that, until the publication rate on the non-existent quantum 1/f noise effect stays around 1 paper/year, it is more economical to refer to the old denials than to write up new refusals.

== See also ==
- Shot noise
- 1/f noise
- White noise
- Johnson–Nyquist noise
- Signal-to-noise ratio
- Noise power
- Noise-equivalent power
- Phase noise
- List of noise topics
- Audio system measurements
- Colors of noise
