= Grey noise =

Random noise whose frequency spectrum follows a psychoacoustic equal loudness curve

10 seconds of grey noise

Inverse ITU-R 468 weighted "grey noise"

Grey noise spectrum

Grey noise is random noise whose frequency spectrum follows an equal-loudness contour (such as an inverted A-weighting curve).

The result is that grey noise contains all frequencies with equal loudness, as opposed to white noise, which contains all frequencies with equal energy. The difference between the two is the result of psychoacoustics, more specifically the fact that the human hearing is more sensitive to some frequencies than others.

Since equal-loudness curves depend not only on the individual but also on the volume at which the noise is played back, there is no one true grey noise. A mathematically simpler and clearly defined approximation of an equal-loudness noise is pink noise which creates an equal amount of energy per octave, not per hertz (i.e. a logarithmic instead of a linear behavior), so pink noise is closer to "equally loud at all frequencies" than white noise is.

== See also ==
- Colors of noise
