= Uncorrelated noise =

The term uncorrelated noise refers to a noise source being uncorrelated to a signal or another noise source. White noise in particular, due to its randomness, is uncorrelated to any other signal and is also serially uncorrelated (i.e., later values of it have no correlation to earlier values). Thus, "uncorrelated noise" is sometimes imprecisely used synonymously with "white noise". However, in general, noise sources can have any noise spectrum and may or may not be correlated with each other (in practice different noise sources are usually uncorrelated). This situation is sometimes described as "uncorrelated colored noise".

== Uncorrelated noise in electronics ==
Electronic circuits may have many types of electronic noise.

If the noise sources are uncorrelated with each other, those noise sources add according to the sum of their power. Thus, when expressed as voltages or currents ($e_1 , \, e_2 , \, \cdots \, e_n$), the square of the total noise ($e_\text{total}^2$) is the sum of squares of the individual noise sources ($e_1^2 + e_2^2 + \cdots + e_n^2$). In other words, the total noise voltage or current ($e_\text{total}$) is the square root of that sum of squares:

$e_\text{total} = \sqrt{e_1^2 + e_2^2 + \cdots + e_n^2} \, .$
