= Equivalent noise resistance =

In telecommunications, an equivalent noise resistance is a quantitative representation in resistance units of the spectral density of a noise-voltage generator, given by $R_n = \frac {\pi W_n}{k T_0}$ where $W_n$ is the spectral density, $k$ is the Boltzmann constant, $T_0$ is the standard noise temperature (290 K), so $kT_0 = 4.00 \times 10^{-21}\,[Ws]$.

Note: The equivalent noise resistance in terms of the mean-square noise-generator voltage, e^{2}, within a frequency increment, Δ f, is given by

$$R_n = \frac{e^2}{4 k T_0\,\Delta f}.$$

This article incorporates public domain material from Federal Standard 1037C. General Services Administration. Archived from the original on 2022-01-22.

== See also ==
- Equivalent input noise
- Effective input noise temperature
