= James E. Cutting =

American cognitive scientist

James Eric Cutting
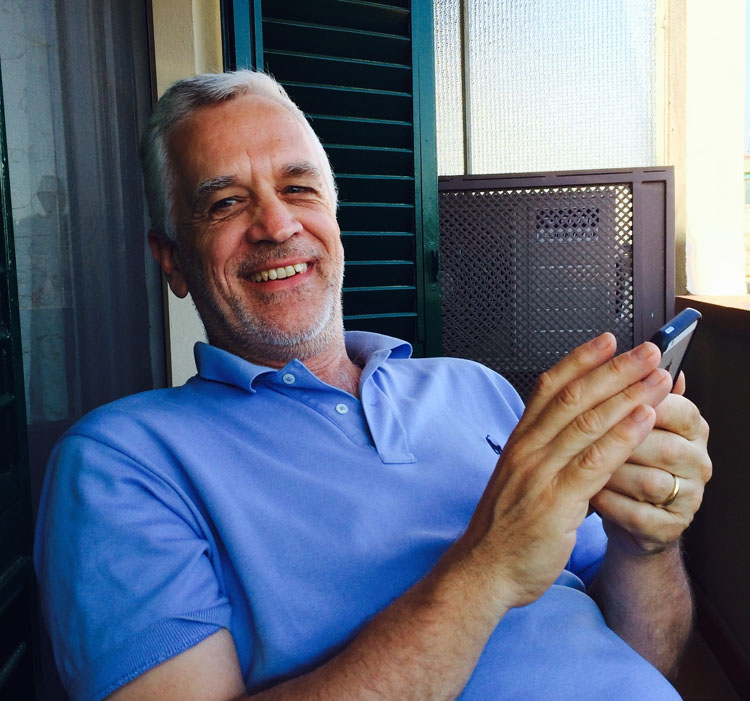
- Education: University of North Carolina at Chapel Hill; Yale University
- Years active: 1974 - 2024

James Eric Cutting is an American cognitive scientist and researcher. He is the Susan Linn Sage Professor emeritus in the Department of Psychology at Cornell University. Cutting has researched how the physical form and narratives of movies in American cinema have evolved over the years. Cutting is also known for his research on the mere exposure effect, on navigation and wayfinding, and biological motion.

Over the last four decades Cutting's research has revolved around various aspects of perception. He has conducted research on the perception of cinema, perception of depth and layout, and art and perception. His research interests also include high and popular culture. He has published over 150 scientific papers and four books. From 2003 to 2007, he served as the editor of the journal Psychological Science.

== Education and early career ==
Cutting graduated with a BA in psychology from the University of North Carolina at Chapel Hill in 1969 and a PhD in psychology from Yale University in 1973. After completing his PhD, he taught at Yale and a year later, he went to Wesleyan University. In 1980, Cutting joined the Cornell faculty as an associate professor in the Psychology department. In 1977–78, he was a visiting scholar at Stanford University and in 1983-84 a visiting scientist at the Atari Sunnyvale Research Laboratory.

== Later career ==
While still teaching at Cornell, Cutting was a visiting scholar at University of Arizona, the University of Padova, the CNRS in Paris and the University of Trieste. He was the editor of Journal of Experimental Psychology: Human Perception and Performance from 1987 to 1993. In 1993, he was awarded a John Simon Guggenheim fellowship. He used the grant to study the perception of depth and subsequently wrote, Perceiving Layout and Knowing Distances: The Interaction, Relative Potency, and Contextual Use of Different Information About Depth, a chapter in the 1995 book Perception of Space and Motion.

Cutting was named the Susan Linn Sage Professor of Psychology in 2013. He served as the chair of the Department of Psychology at Cornell from 2011 to 2016, and retired in 2020.

Cutting is a charter fellow of the Association for Psychological Science, a fellow of the American Psychological Association, a fellow of the Society for Cognitive Studies of the Moving Image, and a fellow of Society of Experimental Psychologists, where he was also the chair from 2003 to 2004.

== Research and writing ==
=== Auditory and visual perception ===
At the beginning of his career, Cutting's research interests revolved around speech perception. In 1975, he co-edited the book The Role of Speech in Language. In late 1970s, he developed a research interest in biological motion, on which he wrote multiple articles through the early 1980s. At this time, his research interest began to other aspects of visual perception including perception of shapes, objects, depth, and motion. He published several papers on these subjects and in 1986 wrote the book, Perception with an Eye for Motion. Throughout the 1990s and early 2000s, visual perception remained the subject of most of his research.

=== Impressionism and Mere Exposure effect ===
In the 1990s, Cutting began spending time at the Fine Arts Library at Cornell, where he studied books about French Impressionist paintings. He collected images, counted them, catalogued them, and later used them for an experiment on mere exposure effect, the theory that the more times one is exposed to something, the more one prefers it over something similar but less familiar. To study this effect, Cutting inserted the pictures of French impressionist paintings into his power point slides over the course of many class lectures. At the end of the semester, he tested the students and found that they preferred the more frequently published pictures over the more obscure ones. The next year in the same class, he showed the better-known paintings only once, and more obscure ones four times each. At the end of the year, the students were again tested and preferred the more obscure and more common ones equally.

This pair of studies led Cutting to study the effect in more detail. He concluded in a 2003 paper "that artistic canons are promoted and maintained, in part, by a diffuse but continual broadcast of their images to the public by museums, authors, and publishers. The repeated presentation of images to an audience without its necessarily focused awareness or remembrance makes mere exposure a prime vehicle for canon formation." He published several other papers on the subject of why people prefer a certain piece of art over the other.

In 2006, Cutting his book Impressionism and Its Canon was published, exploring the connections between high and popular culture.

=== Evolution of Hollywood films ===
After finishing his editorship of Psychological Science in 2006, Cutting continued his interest in popular culture and focused on how Hollywood movies have evolved over the years, studying their structure, physical attributes, and narratives. Cutting and his graduate students used scientific tools and techniques to study 100 years of film, 1915 to 2015, shot by shot. As part of the research, they studied over 300 popular, English-language movies across many different genres. Through their research, Cutting and his students showed that, compared to older movies, contemporary movies have more motion, shorter shot durations, shorter scenes, fewer dissolves, more closeups, fewer characters per frame, less clutter, more parallel action, and higher contrast, all of which help to hold the viewers’ attention, which generally follows a pattern of pink noise.

Throughout last decade the perception of movies has remained Cutting's main research interest. A study published in 2018 by Cutting and his students, showed that filmmakers have adapted the patterns of shot durations, motion, sound amplitude, and scene durations to match better the fluctuation in people's natural patterns of attention. In another study in the domain, Cutting studied how clutter in a shot affected the ability of the viewer to recognise the emotion of the actor. His book Movies on Our Minds appeared in 2021.

== Selected bibliography ==
=== Papers ===
- Categories and Boundaries in Speech and Music. Perception & Psychophysics. (1974)
- Recognizing Friends by Their Walk: Gait Perception Without Familiarity Cues. Bulletin of The Psychonomic Society. (1977)
- Recognizing the Sex of a Walker from a Dynamic Point-light Display. Perception & Psychophysics. (1977)
- Temporal and Spatial Factors in Gait Perception that Influence Gender Recognition. Perception & Psychophysics. (1978)
- A Biomechanical Invariant for Gait Perception. Journal of Experimental Psychology: Human Perception and Performance. (1978)
- Generation of Synthetic Male and Female Walkers Through Manipulation of a Biomechanical Invariant Perception. (1978)
- Infant Sensitivity to Figural Coherence in Biomechanical Motions Journal of Experimental Child Psychology. (1984)
- Three gradients and the perception of flat and curved surfaces. Journal of Experimental Psychology: General. (1984)
- Fractal Curves and Complexity. Perception & Psychophysics. (1987)
- Minimodularity and the Perception of Layout. Journal of Experimental Psychology: General. (1988)
- How We Avoid Collisions with Stationary and Moving Obstacles. Psychological Review. (1995)
- How the Eye Measures Reality and Virtual Reality. Behavior Research Methods, Instrumentation, & Computers. (1997)
- Representing Motion in a Static Image:Constraints and Parallels in Art, Science, and Popular Culture. Perception. (2002)
- Perceptual Artifacts and Phenomena: Gibson's Role in the 20th Century. Foundations of Perceptual Theory. (1993)
- Human Heading Judgements and Object-based Motion Information. Vision Research. (1999)
- Gustave Caillebotte, French Impressionism, and Mere Exposure Psychonomic Bulletin & Review. (2003)
- Asynchronous Neural Integration: Compensation or Computational Tolerance and Skill Acquisition?. Behavioral and Brain Sciences. (2008)
- A Window on Reality: Perceiving Edited Moving Images. Current Directions in Psychological Science. (2012)
- The Framing of Characters in Popular Movies. Art & Perception. (2015)
- Narrative Theory and The Dynamics of Popular Movies. Psychonomic Bulletin & Review. (2016)
- Temporal Fractals in Movies and Mind. Cognitive Research: Principles and Implications. (2018)
- Shaping Edits, Creating Fractals: A Cinematic Case Study. Projections: The Journal for Movies and Mind. (2019)
- Large-Scale Narrative Events in Popular Cinema. Cognitive Research: Principles and Implications. (2019)
- Sequences in Popular Cinema Generate Inconsistent Event Segmentation. Attention, Perception, & Psychophysics. (2019)

=== Books and book chapters ===
- Perceiving Layout and Knowing Distances: The Interaction, Potency, and Contextual Use of Different Information About Depth in Perception of Space and Motion. (1995)
- The Role of Speech in Language (1975) ISBN 978-0262110594
- Perception with an Eye for Motion (1986) ISBN 978-0262031196
- Impressionism and Its Canon (2006) ISBN 978-0761833444
- Movies on Our Minds (2021) ISBN 978-0-19-756777-7
