= Photon noise =

Randomness in photon detector signal

Photon noise is the randomness in signal associated with photons arriving at a detector. For a simple black body emitting on an absorber, the noise-equivalent power is given by

$$\mathrm{NEP}^2 = 2 h^2 \nu^2 \Delta\nu \left( \frac{n}{\eta} + n^2 \right)$$

where $h$ is the Planck constant, $\nu$ is the central frequency, $\Delta\nu$ is the bandwidth, $n$ is the occupation number and $\eta$ is the optical efficiency.

The first term is essentially shot noise whereas the second term is related to the bosonic character of photons, variously known as "Bose noise" or "wave noise". At low occupation number, such as in the visible spectrum, the shot noise term dominates. At high occupation number, however, typical of the radio spectrum, the Bose term dominates.

== See also ==
- Hanbury Brown and Twiss effect
- Phonon noise
