= Noise-equivalent flux density =

Noise figure in optics

In optics the noise-equivalent flux density (NEFD) or noise-equivalent irradiance (NEI) of a system is the level of flux density required to be equivalent to the noise present in the system. It is a measure used by astronomers in determining the accuracy of observations.

The NEFD can be related to a light detector's noise-equivalent power for a collection area A and a photon bandwidth $\nu$ by:

$\mathrm{NEFD} = \eta \frac{\mathrm{NEP}}{A \nu}$,

where a factor $\eta$ (often 2, in the case of switching between measuring a source and measuring off-source) accounts for the photon statistics for the mode of operation.

== See also ==
External quantum efficiency
