= Aldert van der Ziel =

Dutch physicist (1910–1991)

Aldert van der Ziel (12 December 1910, Zandeweer – 20 January 1991, Minneapolis), was a Dutch physicist who studied electronic noise processes in materials such as semiconductors and metals.

== Biography ==
Aldert van der Ziel was a pioneering researcher into the phenomenon of flicker noise in physical electronics. He published 15 books and more than 500 scientific papers. He was also a writer on Christianity, particularly the relationship between science and religion. Van der Ziel belonged to a conservative Lutheran church.

Van der Ziel obtained a Ph.D. in 1934 from the University of Groningen. He worked at Philips in Eindhoven until 1947. In 1947 he went to Vancouver, British Columbia, Canada and moved to the University of Minnesota in 1950 to become professor of electrical engineering. He was also associated, later, with the University of Florida at Gainesville. Aldert van der Ziel was elected in 1978 as a member of National Academy of Engineering in Electronics, Communication & Information Systems Engineering for contributions to the study of noise in electron devices and contributions to graduate education.

The IEEE has an award named after Aldert van der Ziel, which is given during the biennial International Semiconductor Device Research Symposium (ISDRS) sponsored by the IEEE Electron Devices Society, for "a distinguished career in education and research". Past recipients are Lester Eastmann, Herbert Kroemer (Nobel Prize in Physics winner), Michael Shur, Marvin H. White, James D. Plummer, Ben Streetman, Mark Lundstrom and Tsu-Jae King Liu.

== Awards ==
- 1956: IEEE Fellow
- 1975: Honorary doctorate, University Paul Sabatier, Toulouse
- 1978: National Academy of Engineering
- 1980: IEEE Education Medal
- 1981: Honorary doctorate, University of Eindhoven

== Bibliography ==
=== Books ===
- Noise (Prentice-Hall electrical engineering series), Aldert Van der Ziel, Publ. Prentice-Hall (1954)
- Solid State Physical Electronics 2nd Ed, Aldert Van der Ziel, Publ. Prentice-Hall (1968)
- Noise in Measurements, Aldert Van Der Ziel, Publisher: John Wiley & Sons Inc (1976) ISBN 0-471-89895-3
- Nonlinear Electronic Circuits, Aldert Van Der Ziel, Publ. John Wiley & Sons Inc (1977) ISBN 0-471-02227-6
- Noise in Solid State Devices and Circuits, Aldert Van Der Ziel, Publ. Wiley-Interscience (1986) ISBN 0-471-83234-0
- The Natural Sciences and the Christian Message, Aldert Van der Ziel, Greenwood Publishing Group, Incorporated (1976) ISBN 0-8371-7941-6
- Genesis and Scientific Inquiry, Aldert Van der Ziel, T. S. Denison & Company, Incorporated (1965) Library of Congress 65–19103

=== Selected papers ===
- Der Ziel, A. Van (August 1962). "Thermal noise in field effect transistors". Proceedings of the IRE. 50 (8): 1808–1812. doi:10.1109/JRPROC.1962.288221. ISSN 2162-6634.
- Van Der Ziel, A. (1988). "Unified presentation of 1/f noise in electron devices: Fundamental 1/f noise sources". Proceedings of the IEEE. 76 (3): 233–258. doi:10.1109/5.4401. ISSN 0018-9219.: One of the described topics quantum 1/f noise is now controversial.
