= Multiplicative noise =

Signal processing phenomenon

In signal processing, the term multiplicative noise refers to an unwanted random signal that gets multiplied into some relevant signal during capture, transmission, or other processing.

Multiplicative noise is a type of signal-dependent noise where the noise amplitude scales with the signal's intensity. Unlike additive noise, which is independent of the signal, multiplicative noise complicates processing due to its dependence on the underlying signal.

An important example is the speckle noise commonly observed in radar imagery. Examples of multiplicative noise affecting digital photographs are proper shadows due to undulations on the surface of the imaged objects, shadows cast by complex objects like foliage and Venetian blinds, dark spots caused by dust in the lens or image sensor, and variations in the gain of individual elements of the image sensor array.

== Multiplicative Noise in Stochastic Differential Equations (SDEs) ==
In the realm of stochastic differential equations (SDEs), multiplicative noise is used to model systems in which the amplitude of stochastic fluctuations internal to the system depend on the state of said system. One of the most prominent examples of multiplicative noise in SDEs is Geometric Brownian motion (GBM). GBM is widely used in finance to model stock prices, currency exchange rates, and other assets. The Geometric Brownian Motion (GBM) model is widely used in financial mathematics to describe the evolution of asset prices. It assumes that the proportional returns of the asset follow a normal distribution over infinitesimal time intervals. The GBM stochastic differential equation is given by: $dX_t = \mu X_t \, dt + \sigma X_t \, dW_t,$ where:

- $X_t$ is the asset price at time $t$,
- $\mu$ is the expected return (drift rate),
- $\sigma$ is the volatility of returns,
- $W_t$ is a standard Brownian motion (Wiener process).

Theorem (Itô's formula). Let $X_t$ be given by: $dX_t = b(t,\omega)\,dt + \sigma(t,\omega)\,dW_t.$ Let $f(t,x)$ be a $C^{1,2}$ function (i.e., $C^1$ in time, $C^2$ in space). Then the process $Y_t = f(X_t)$ satisfies $df(X_t) = \left( \partial_t f(t,X_t) + \partial_x f(t,X_t) b(t,\omega) + \frac{1}{2} \partial_{x,x} f(t,X_t) \sigma^2(t,\omega) \right) dt + \partial_x f(t,X_t) \sigma(t,\omega) dW_t.$

Set $f(t,x) = \log x.$

Applying Itô's formula to $Y_t = f(t,x)$, we compute: $d(\log X_t) = d(Y_t) = \left[ \frac{1}{X_t} (\mu X_t) + \frac{1}{2} \left( -\frac{1}{X_t^2} \right) (\sigma^2 X_t^2) \right] dt + \frac{1}{X_t} (\sigma X_t) dW_t.$

Simplifying each term: $d(\log X_t) = d(Y_t) = \left( \mu - \frac{1}{2} \sigma^2 \right) dt + \sigma dW_t.$

Integrating in time, we have: $\log X_t = Y_t = Y_0 + \left( \mu - \frac{1}{2} \sigma^2 \right) t + \sigma W_t, \quad \text{where} \quad Y_0 = \log X_0.$

Exponentiating both sides gives the solution for $X_t$: $X_t = \exp(Y_t) = X_0 \exp\left( \left( \mu - \frac{1}{2} \sigma^2 \right) t + \sigma W_t \right).$

The solution to this SDE can be explicitly written as: $X_t = X_0 \exp\left( \left( \mu - \frac{1}{2}\sigma^2 \right) t + \sigma W_t \right),$ where $X_0$ is the initial asset price.

The key properties of the GBM model include:

- Log-normal distribution: For any fixed $t > 0$, $X_t$ follows a log-normal distribution.
- Non-negativity: $X_t > 0$ almost surely for all $t$, ensuring realistic modeling of asset prices that cannot become negative.
- Multiplicative noise: The random fluctuation term $\sigma X_t \, dW_t$ is proportional to $X_t$, reflecting the empirical fact that larger asset prices tend to exhibit larger absolute fluctuations.

The GBM model forms the basis for the Black–Scholes model used to derive closed-form solutions for European option pricing.

In financial mathematics, the presence of multiplicative noise reflects the empirical observation that the magnitude of fluctuations in asset prices tends to scale with the asset's value. This property is crucial in the derivation of models such as the Black–Scholes model for option pricing.

The Cox–Ingersoll–Ross (CIR) model is described by the stochastic differential equation: $dr_t = a(b - r_t)\,dt + \sigma \sqrt{r_t}\,dW_t,$ where:

- $r_t$ is the short-term interest rate,
- $a > 0$ is the speed of mean reversion,
- $b > 0$ is the long-term mean level,
- $\sigma > 0$ is the volatility parameter,
- $W_t$ is a standard Brownian motion.

The CIR process does not have a simple closed-form solution in terms of $r_t$ and $W_t$. However, its conditional distribution is known: for fixed initial value $r_0$, the variable $r_t$ follows a scaled noncentral chi-squared distribution.

For numerical simulation, the Euler–Maruyama method can be applied, discretizing time with step size $\Delta t$: $r_{n+1} = r_n + a(b - r_n)\Delta t + \sigma \sqrt{r_n}\, \Delta W_n,$ where $\Delta W_n$ are independent normal increments with $\Delta W_n \sim \mathcal{N}(0, \Delta t).$

Because of the square-root diffusion term, care must be taken to ensure $r_n \geq 0$ during simulation. Several methods are used to address this:

- Full truncation scheme: setting negative values to zero.
- Reflection scheme: reflecting negative values back to positive.
- Semi-explicit scheme:

$r_{n+1} = \left( \sqrt{ r_n + a(b - r_n)\Delta t } + \frac{\sigma}{2} \Delta W_n \right)^2,$ which better preserves positivity and improves numerical stability.

Alternatively, $r_t$ can be exactly sampled by generating a random variable from the appropriate noncentral chi-squared distribution.

The Heston model is a stochastic volatility model used in mathematical finance to describe the evolution of asset prices and their volatility. It extends the Black–Scholes framework by allowing the volatility to change randomly over time.

The Heston model is defined by the following system of stochastic differential equations:
$$\begin{aligned}
dS_t &= \mu S_t \, dt + \sqrt{v_t} S_t \, dW_t^{(1)}, \\
dv_t &= \kappa(\theta - v_t) \, dt + \xi \sqrt{v_t} \, dW_t^{(2)},
\end{aligned}$$
where:

- $S_t$ is the asset price at time $t$,
- $v_t$ is the instantaneous variance (i.e., square of volatility),
- $\mu$ is the drift rate of the asset,
- $\kappa$ is the rate at which $v_t$ reverts to its long-term mean $\theta$,
- $\xi$ is the volatility of volatility,
- $W_t^{(1)}$ and $W_t^{(2)}$ are standard Brownian motions with correlation $\rho$

The key feature of the Heston model is that the volatility $\sqrt{v_t}$ is itself a random process driven by a square-root diffusion (similar to the CIR process). This allows the model to capture important empirical features of financial markets, such as:

- Volatility clustering,
- Leverage effect (via $\rho < 0$),
- Implied volatility smiles and skews.

The Heston model admits a closed-form solution for European option prices using characteristic functions and Fourier transform methods, which makes it both tractable and flexible for calibration to market data.

=== General Mathematical Form of Multiplicative Noise ===
In general, a stochastic differential equation with multiplicative noise can be written as: $dX_t = f(X_t, t)\,dt + g(X_t, t)\,dW_t,$ where:

- $f(X_t, t)$ is the drift term,
- $g(X_t, t)$ is the diffusion coefficient,
- $W_t$ is a standard Brownian motion.

When the diffusion coefficient $g$ depends explicitly on the state variable $X_t$, the noise is said to be multiplicative. This contrasts with additive noise, where $g$ is independent of $X_t$. Multiplicative noise introduces complexities in both analytical and numerical treatments of SDEs, including the need to carefully choose between interpretations such as the Itô calculus and the Stratonovich calculus.

In particular, under the Itô interpretation, the presence of state-dependent noise can induce additional drift terms when transforming variables, a phenomenon known as the Itô correction.
