= Artificial noise =

Sounds and signals generated by humans

Artificial noise is a wave, vibration, audible, electromagnetic, or other signal, generated by a human source.

== Usage ==
The purpose of generating artificial noise, whether intentional or not, may vary, depending on what is considered noise in a particular context. It can be used to experiment on a subject by controlling the frequency or amplitude of the artificial noise to ascertain how the subject interacts with external stimulation. For example, to test the sensitivity of a microphone noise-reducing filter, the test administrator could generate artificial noise in a laboratory setting to determine whether the microphone suppresses the noise (i.e. filters it out), or interprets the noise as something that is not noise (i.e. passes it through). In the context of urban dwellings or establishments, artificial noise might be called light pollution, or commuter traffic.

== Usage in sports ==
In the context of spectator sports, artificial noise is the use of artificial sound-making devices to show the audience's support.

In organized sports' early years, noise, such as there was, came solely from the cheering of a team's supporters. Early in the history of American football, however, the practice of employing cheerleaders became standard, and these individuals soon began to use megaphones to lead the cheering. Even prior to the era of electronics, the use of horns and cowbells had begun in an attempt to make noise louder than that which could be created through the mere use of the human voice. The invention of the compressed air horn gave fans another weapon in their arsenal. As fan sophistication increased, they learned to make noise in a way which distracted the visiting team to the assistance of their own. College football teams, especially, which had their own marching bands, came to depend upon the band to play loudly at strategic times, which, while hardly sportsmanlike, could be very effective.

Two developments more than any others led sports leagues to regulate artificial noise. The first was advances in electronics which put items like portable bullhorns within reach of the typical fan. These devices could create an incredible level of noise which could make game play almost intolerable. The second was the rise of fan interest in college basketball, which is of course played in indoor venues in which the sound typically dissipates far less than in outdoor ones. Leagues did not desire to end the vocal support of fans, but learned that they would have to regulate artificial noise made by electronics, horns, bells, and the like, to make game play tolerable. Most leagues eventually banned these devices altogether, banned cheerleaders from access to public-address systems, and prevented bands from playing while the ball was actually in play. Most leagues have also followed the lead of the National Football League and also banned the playing of recorded music while actual game play is occurring, limiting it to when the ball is dead. In 2007, the Indianapolis Colts were accused of adding artificial noise against the New England Patriots

In football, the referee can call a "delay of game" penalty on the home team if, after being warned, the management of the venue does not or cannot do enough to prevent the use of artificial noisemakers. In basketball, a technical foul can be called on the home team if it is felt that they are not making a sufficient effort to prevent the generation of artificial noise. In the 2004 Arena Football League playoffs, the San Jose SaberCats organization was actually fined $10,000 for distributing cowbells prior to a game versus the Tampa Bay Storm. The most common devices used to create artificial noise today are "thunder sticks", long aluminized PET film balloons which make a sort of drumming noise when banged together. It seems likely that these will be banned at some point in the near future.

Some groups of fans routinely defy bans on artificial noisemakers. The most notorious noise scofflaws in North American sports are football fans of Mississippi State University. The Southeastern Conference (SEC), has completely banned artificial noisemakers for many years; however, this has not stopped MSU fans from smuggling in cowbells (long a tradition at MSU) by the thousands and ringing them during games. However, they now generally restrict their ringing to times when the ball is dead.

== See also ==
- Artificial crowd noise
