= Channel noise level =

Noise measurement in telecommunications

In telecommunications, the term channel noise level has the following meanings:

1. The ratio of the noise in the communication channel at any point in a transmission system to an arbitrary level chosen as a reference. (Note: The channel noise level may be expressed in (a) dB above reference noise (dBrn), (b) dB above reference noise with C-message weighting (dBrnC), or (c) adjusted dB (dBa).) (Note: Each unit used to measure channel noise level reflects a circuit noise reading of a specialized instrument designed to account for different interference effects that occur under specified conditions.)
2. The noise power spectral density in the frequency range of interest.
3. The average noise power in the frequency range of interest.

== See also ==
- Ambient noise level
