= Gaussian noise =

Type of noise in signal processing

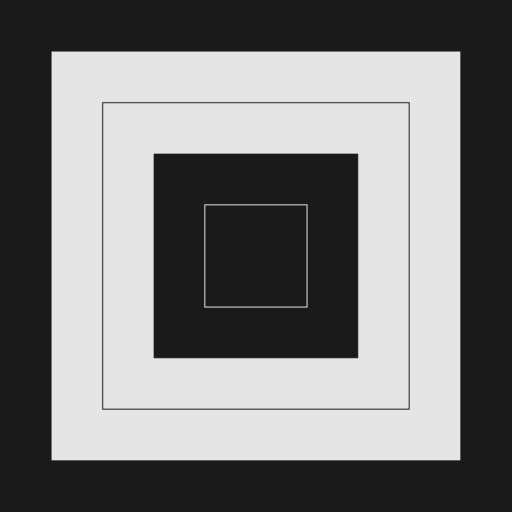
Without noise

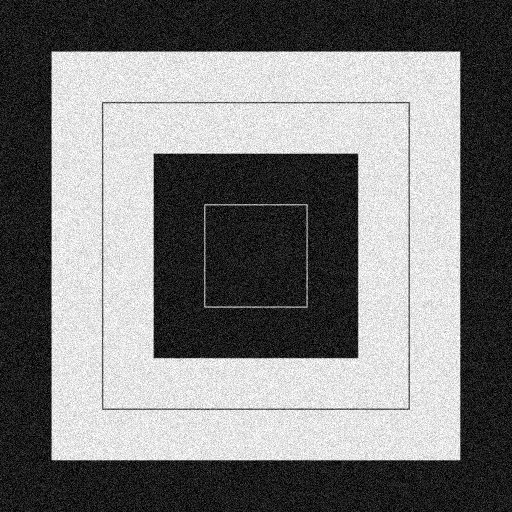
With Gaussian noise

In signal processing theory, Gaussian noise, named after Carl Friedrich Gauss, is a kind of signal noise that has a probability density function (pdf) equal to that of the normal distribution (which is also known as the Gaussian distribution). In other words, the values that the noise can take are Gaussian-distributed. A special case is white Gaussian noise, in which the values at any pair of time points are identically distributed and statistically independent (and hence uncorrelated).

The probability density function $p$ of a Gaussian random variable $z$ is given by:

$$p(z) = \frac 1 {\sigma\sqrt{2\pi}} e^{-\frac{(z-\mu)^2}{2\sigma^2} }$$

where—in the case of digital imaging—$z$ represents the grey level, $\mu$ the mean grey value and $\sigma$ its standard deviation.

== Applications ==
In communication channel testing and modelling, Gaussian noise is used as additive white noise to generate additive white Gaussian noise.

In telecommunications and computer networking, communication channels can be affected by wideband Gaussian noise coming from many natural sources, such as the thermal vibrations of atoms in conductors (referred to as thermal noise or Johnson–Nyquist noise), shot noise, black-body radiation from the earth and other warm objects, and from celestial sources such as the Sun.

In digital images sources of Gaussian noise arise during acquisition e.g. sensor noise caused by poor illumination and/or high temperature, and/or transmission e.g. electronic circuit noise. In digital image processing Gaussian noise can be reduced using a spatial filter, though when smoothing an image, an undesirable outcome may result in the blurring of fine-scaled image edges and details because they also correspond to blocked high frequencies. Conventional spatial filtering techniques for noise removal include: mean (convolution) filtering, median filtering and Gaussian smoothing.

== See also ==
- Gaussian process
- Gaussian smoothing
