= Transient noise =

Transient noise pulses consist of a relatively short pulse followed by decaying low frequency oscillations. The initial peak is often due to an impulse interference, and the following oscillations are due to resonance on the channel that received the initial pulse.

The source of these noise pulses is often channel interference.

== See also ==
- Transient (acoustics)
