= Generation–recombination noise =

Generation–recombination noise, or g–r noise, is a type of electrical signal noise caused statistically by the fluctuation of the generation and recombination of electrons in semiconductor-based photon detectors.

== See also ==
- Noise
- Noise (audio) – residual low level "hiss or hum"
- Noise (electronic) – related to electronic circuitry.
- Noise figure – the ratio of the output noise power to attributable thermal noise.
- Signal noise – in science, fluctuations in the signal being received.
- Thermal noise – sets a fundamental lower limit to what can be measured.
- Weighting filter
- ITU-R 468 noise weighting
- A-weighting
- List of noise topics
