= Brownian noise =

Type of noise produced by Brownian motion

Brown noise
10 seconds of Brownian noise

Sample trace of Brownian noise

In science, Brownian noise, also known as Brown noise or red noise, is the type of signal noise produced by Brownian motion, hence its alternative name of random walk noise. The term "Brown noise" does not come from the color, but after Robert Brown, who documented the erratic motion for multiple types of inanimate particles in water. The term "red noise" comes from the "white noise"/"white light" analogy; red noise is strong in longer wavelengths, similar to the red end of the visible spectrum. In acoustics, this translates to a sound that is heavily weighted towards low frequencies, producing a deep, muffled roar.

== Explanation ==
The graphic representation of the sound signal mimics a Brownian pattern. Its spectral density is inversely proportional to f ^{2}, meaning it has higher intensity at lower frequencies, even more so than pink noise. It decreases in intensity by 6 dB per octave (20 dB per decade). To put this into perspective, for every doubling of frequency, the power of Brownian noise drops by a factor of four.

When heard, it has a "damped" or "soft" quality compared to white and pink noise. Because the higher frequencies are so severely attenuated, the sound is a low roar resembling a waterfall, heavy rainfall, or the distant rumble of thunder. See also violet noise, which is the exact opposite with a 6 dB increase per octave.

Strictly, Brownian motion has a Gaussian probability distribution, but the term "red noise" could apply to any random signal with the 1/f ^{2} frequency spectrum, regardless of its underlying probability distribution.

== Power spectrum ==
Spectrum of Brownian noise, with a slope of –20 dB per decade

A Brownian motion, also known as a Wiener process, is obtained as the integral of a white noise signal:
$$W(t) = \int_0^t \frac{dW}{d\tau}(\tau) d\tau$$
meaning that Brownian motion is the integral of the white noise $t\mapsto dW(t)$, whose power spectral density is flat:
$$S_0 = \left|\mathcal{F}\left[t\mapsto\frac{dW}{dt}(t)\right](\omega)\right|^2 = \text{const}.$$

Note that here $\mathcal{F}$ denotes the Fourier transform, and $S_0$ is a constant. An important property of this transform is that the derivative of any distribution transforms as
$$\mathcal{F}\left[t\mapsto\frac{dW}{dt}(t)\right](\omega) = i \omega \mathcal{F}[t\mapsto W(t)](\omega),$$
from which we can conclude that the power spectrum of Brownian noise is
$$S(\omega) = \big|\mathcal{F}[t\mapsto W(t)](\omega)\big|^2 = \frac{S_0}{\omega^2}.$$

This mathematically demonstrates that integrating a white noise signal in the time domain corresponds to dividing its spectrum by the angular frequency $\omega$ in the frequency domain, resulting in the characteristic $1/\omega^2$ power spectral density. An individual Brownian motion trajectory presents a spectrum $S(\omega) = S_0 / \omega^2$, where the amplitude $S_0$ is a random variable, even in the limit of an infinitely long trajectory.

== Production ==
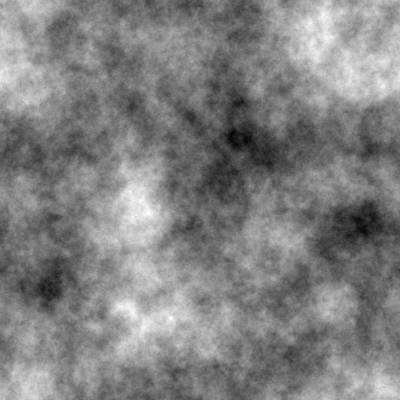
A two-dimensional Brownian noise image, generated with software. (Note: Available freely on GitHub:)

A 3D Brownian noise signal, shown here as a software generated animation, where each frame is a 2D slice of the 3D array

Brown noise can be produced by integrating white noise. That is, whereas (digital) white noise can be produced by randomly choosing each sample independently, Brown noise can be produced by adding a random offset to each sample to obtain the next one.

As Brownian noise contains infinite spectral power at low frequencies, the signal tends to drift away infinitely from the origin. A leaky integrator might be used in audio or electromagnetic applications to ensure the signal does not “wander off”, that is, exceed the limits of the system's dynamic range:

- This is typically achieved in digital processing by multiplying the previous sample by a decay factor slightly less than one (e.g., 0.999) before adding the new random white noise offset.
- This slowly pulls the signal back towards zero over time, preventing continuous DC offset accumulation.
- This turns the Brownian noise into Ornstein–Uhlenbeck noise, which has a flat spectrum at lower frequencies, and only becomes “red” above the chosen cutoff frequency established by the decay factor.

Brownian noise can also be computer-generated by first generating a white noise signal, Fourier-transforming it, then dividing the amplitudes of the different frequency components by the frequency (in one dimension), or by the frequency squared (in two dimensions) etc. Matlab programs are available to generate Brownian and other power-law coloured noise in one or any number of dimensions.

== Experimental evidence ==
Evidence of Brownian noise, or more accurately, of Brownian processes has been found in different fields including chemistry, electromagnetism, fluid-dynamics, economics, where it forms the mathematical basis for models like Black-Scholes used in option pricing, and human neuromotor control.

=== Human neuromotor control ===
In human neuromotor control, Brownian processes were recognized as a biomarker of human natural drift in both postural tasks—such as quietly standing or holding an object in one's hand—as well as dynamic tasks. The work by Tessari et al. highlighted how these Brownian processes in humans might provide the first behavioral support to the neuroscientific hypothesis that humans encode motion in terms of descending neural velocity commands, rather than absolute position commands.
