= Equivalent pulse code modulation noise =

In telecommunications, equivalent pulse code modulation (PCM) noise is the amount of noise power on a frequency-division multiplexing (FDM) or wire communication channel necessary to approximate the same judgment of speech quality created by quantization noise in a PCM channel.

Note 1: The speech quality judgment is based on comparative tests.

Note 2: Generally, 33.5 dBrnC ±2.5 dB is considered the approximate equivalent PCM noise of a 7-bit PCM system.
