= Equivalent input =

Equivalent input (also input-referred, referred-to-input (RTI), or input-related), is a method of referring to the signal or noise level at the output of a system as if it were due to an input to the same system. This input's value is called the Equivalent input. This is accomplished by removing all signal changes (e.g. amplifier gain, transducer sensitivity, etc.) to get the units to match the input.

== Examples ==
=== Equivalent input noise ===
A microphone converts acoustical energy to electrical energy. Microphones have some level of electrical noise at their output. This noise may have contributions from random diaphragm movement, thermal noise, or a dozen other sources, but those can all be thought of as an imaginary acoustic noise source injecting sound into the (now noiseless) microphone. The units on this noise are no longer volts, but units of sound pressure (pascals or dBSPL), which can be directly compared to the desired sound pressure inputs. This is called equivalent input noise (EIN), or input-referred noise (IRN), or referred-to-input (RTI) noise.

=== Input-related interference level ===
A device which uses a microphone may be susceptible to electromagnetic interference which causes sonic artifacts. The problem is not in the microphone, but the interference level can be related back to the input to compare to the level of typical inputs to see how audible the artifact is. This is called input-related interference level (IRIL).
