= Mode partition noise =

In an optical communication link, mode partition noise is phase jitter of the signal caused by the combined effects of mode hopping in the optical source and intramodal distortion in the fiber.

Mode hopping causes random wavelength changes which in turn affect the group velocity, i.e., the propagation time. Over a long length of fiber, the cumulative effect is to create jitter, i.e. mode partition noise. The variation of group velocity creates the mode partition noise.
