= Noise print =

A noise print is part of a technique used in noise reduction. A noise print is commonly used in audio mastering to help reduce the effects of unwanted noise from a piece of audio. In this case, the noise print would be a recording of the ambient noise in the room, which is then used in spectral subtraction to set multiple expanders, effectively gating out those frequencies whilst the signal level in that band is lower than that in the noise print. Many plugins for studio software can be used to apply noise reduction in this way.

Noise reduction usually results in unwanted artifacts, sometimes referred to as twittering or birdies. Different algorithms for noise reduction control these artifacts with varying levels of success.

== See also ==
- Dark frame – analogous technique in image noise reduction
