= Burst noise =

Type of electronic noise that occurs in semiconductors

Graph of burst noise

Burst noise is a type of electronic noise that occurs in semiconductors and ultra-thin gate oxide films. It is also called random telegraph noise (RTN), popcorn noise, impulse noise, bi-stable noise, or random telegraph signal (RTS) noise.

It consists of sudden step-like transitions between two or more discrete voltage or current levels, as high as several hundred microvolts, at random and unpredictable times. Each shift in offset voltage or current often lasts from several milliseconds to seconds, and sounds like popcorn popping if hooked up to an audio speaker.

Burst noise was first observed in early point contact diodes, then re-discovered during the commercialization of one of the first semiconductor op-amps; the 709. No single source of burst noise is theorized to explain all occurrences, however the most commonly invoked cause is the random trapping and release of charge carriers at thin film interfaces or at defect sites in bulk semiconductor crystal. In cases where these charges have a significant impact on transistor performance (such as under a MOS gate or in a bipolar base region), the output signal can be substantial. These defects can be caused by manufacturing processes, such as heavy ion implantation, or by unintentional side-effects such as surface contamination.

Individual op-amps can be screened for burst noise with peak detector circuits, to minimize the amount of noise in a specific application.

Burst noise is modeled mathematically by means of the telegraph process, a Markovian continuous-time stochastic process that jumps discontinuously between two distinct values.

== See also ==
- Atomic electron transition
- Telegraph process
