= Shot noise =

Type of electronic noise

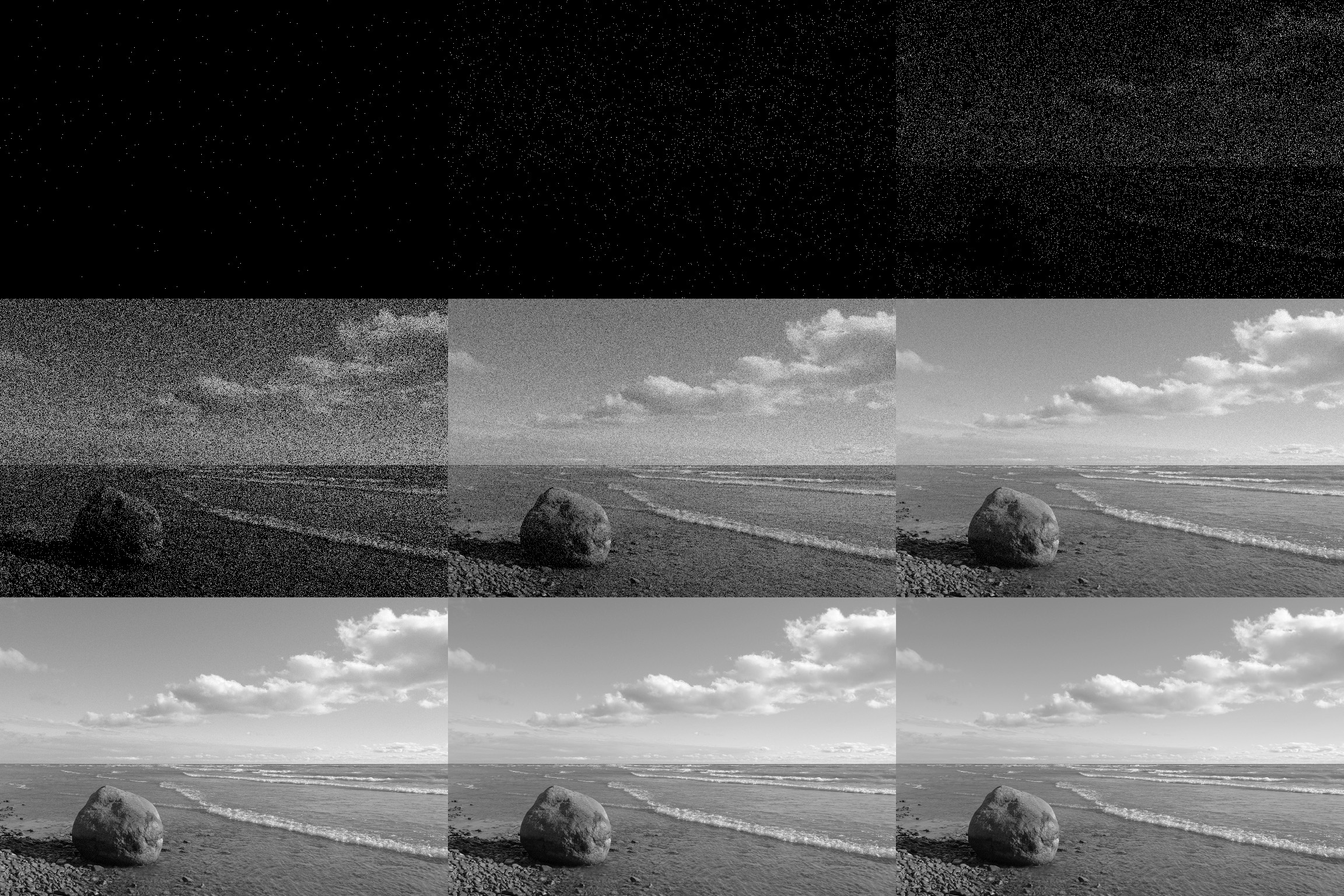
Photon noise simulation. Number of photons per pixel increases from left to right and from upper row to bottom row.

Shot noise or Poisson noise is a type of noise which can be modeled by a Poisson process.

In electronics, shot noise originates from the discrete nature of electric charge. Shot noise also occurs in photon counting in optical devices, where shot noise is associated with the particle nature of light. Shot noise is also observed in nuclear physics where particles like neutrons, muons, alpha particles, beta particles (electrons), or gamma rays impinge on their respective particle detector.

== Origin ==
In a statistical experiment such as tossing a fair coin and counting the occurrences of heads and tails, the numbers of heads and tails after many throws will differ by only a tiny percentage, while after only a few throws outcomes with a significant excess of heads over tails or vice versa are common; if an experiment with a few throws is repeated over and over, the outcomes will fluctuate a lot. From the law of large numbers, one can show that the relative fluctuations reduce as the reciprocal square root of the number of throws, a result valid for all statistical fluctuations, including shot noise.

Shot noise exists because phenomena such as light and electric current consist of the movement of discrete (also called "quantized") 'packets'. Consider light—a stream of discrete photons—coming out of a laser pointer and hitting a wall to create a visible spot. The fundamental physical processes that govern light emission are such that these photons are emitted from the laser at random times; but the many billions of photons needed to create a spot are so many that the brightness, the number of photons per unit of time, varies only infinitesimally with time. However, if the laser brightness is reduced until only a handful of photons hit the wall every second, the relative fluctuations in number of photons, i.e., brightness, will be significant, just as when tossing a coin a few times. These fluctuations are shot noise.

The concept of shot noise was first introduced in 1918 by Walter Schottky who studied fluctuations of current in vacuum tubes.

Shot noise may be dominant when the finite number of particles that carry energy (such as electrons in an electronic circuit or photons in an optical device) is sufficiently small so that uncertainties due to the Poisson distribution, which describes the occurrence of independent random events, are significant. It is important in electronics, telecommunications, optical detection, nuclear physics, and fundamental physics.

The term can also be used to describe any noise source, even if solely mathematical, of similar origin. For instance, particle simulations may produce a certain amount of "noise", where because of the small number of particles simulated, the simulation exhibits undue statistical fluctuations which don't reflect the real-world system. The magnitude of shot noise increases according to the square root of the expected number of events, such as the electric current or intensity of light. But since the strength of the signal itself increases more rapidly, the relative proportion of shot noise decreases and the signal-to-noise ratio (considering only shot noise) increases anyway. Thus shot noise is most frequently observed with small currents or low light intensities that have been amplified.

The number of photons that are collected by a given detector varies, and follows a Poisson distribution, depicted here for averages of 1, 4, and 10.

=== Signal-to-Noise ===
For large numbers, the Poisson distribution approaches a normal distribution about its mean, and the elementary events (photons, electrons, etc.) are no longer individually observed, typically making shot noise in actual observations indistinguishable from true Gaussian noise. Since the standard deviation of shot noise is equal to the square root of the average number of events N, the signal-to-noise ratio (SNR) is given by:

$$\mathrm{SNR} = \frac{N}{\sqrt{N}}  = {\sqrt {N}}. \,$$

Thus when N is very large, the signal-to-noise ratio is very large as well, and any relative fluctuations in N due to other sources are more likely to dominate over shot noise. However, when the other noise source is at a fixed level, such as thermal noise, or grows slower than $\sqrt{N}$, increasing N (the DC current or light level, etc.) can lead to dominance of shot noise.

== Properties ==
=== Electronic devices ===
==== Potential barriers ====
Shot noise is produced when current crosses a potential barrier such as a p-n junction. A semiconductor diode can be used as a noise source by passing a particular direct current through it.

In certain situations, interactions can lead to an enhancement of shot noise, which is the result of a super-poissonian statistics. For example, in a resonant tunneling diode the interplay of electrostatic interaction and of the density of states in the quantum well leads to a strong enhancement of shot noise when the device is biased in the negative differential resistance region of the current-voltage characteristics.

Since shot noise is a Poisson process, the root mean square current fluctuation can be computed as

$$\sigma_i=\sqrt{2qI\,\Delta f}$$

where q is the elementary charge of an electron, Δf is the single-sided bandwidth in hertz over which the noise is considered, and I is the DC flowing.

For a current of 100 mA, measuring the current noise over a bandwidth of 1 Hz, we obtain

$$\sigma_i = 0.18\,\mathrm{nA}  \; .$$

If this noise current is fed through a resistor a noise voltage of

$$\sigma_v = \sigma_i \, R$$

would be generated. Coupling this noise through a capacitor, one could supply a noise power of

$$P = {\frac 1 2}qI\,\Delta f R.$$

to a matched load.

==== Mesoscopic systems ====
Shot noise in electronic circuits consists of random fluctuations of direct current (DC), which is due to electric current being the flow of discrete charges (electrons). Because the electron has such a tiny charge, however, shot noise is of relative insignificance in many (but not all) cases of electrical conduction. For instance 1 ampere of current consists of about 6.24×10^{18} electrons per second; even though this number will randomly vary by several billion in any given second, such a fluctuation is minuscule compared to the current itself. In addition, shot noise is often less significant as compared with two other noise sources in electronic circuits, flicker noise and Johnson–Nyquist noise. However, shot noise is temperature and frequency independent, in contrast to Johnson–Nyquist noise, which is proportional to temperature, and flicker noise, with the spectral density decreasing with increasing frequency. Therefore, at high frequencies and low temperatures shot noise may become the dominant source of noise.

With very small currents and considering shorter time scales (thus wider bandwidths) shot noise can be significant. For instance, a microwave circuit operates on time scales of less than a nanosecond and if we were to have a current of 16 nanoamperes that would amount to only 100 electrons passing every nanosecond. According to Poisson statistics the actual number of electrons in any nanosecond would vary by 10 electrons rms, so that one sixth of the time fewer than 90 electrons would pass a point and one sixth of the time more than 110 electrons would be counted in a nanosecond. Now with this small current viewed on this time scale, the shot noise amounts to 1/10 of the direct current itself.

The result by Schottky, based on the assumption that the statistics of electrons passage is Poissonian, reads for the spectral noise density at the frequency $f$,

$$S (f) = 2e\vert I \vert \ ,$$

where $e$ is the electron charge, and $I$ is the average current of the electron stream. The noise spectral power is frequency independent, which means the noise is white. This can be combined with the Landauer formula, which relates the average current with the transmission eigenvalues $T_n$ of the contact through which the current is measured ($n$ labels transport channels). In the simplest case, these transmission eigenvalues can be taken to be energy independent and so the Landauer formula is

$$I = \frac{e^2}{\pi\hbar} V \sum_n T_n \ ,$$

where $V$ is the applied voltage. This provides for

$$S = \frac{2e^3}{\pi\hbar} \vert V \vert \sum_n T_n \ ,$$

commonly referred to as the Poisson value of shot noise, $S_P$. This is a classical result in the sense that it does not take into account that electrons obey Fermi–Dirac statistics. The correct result takes into account the quantum statistics of electrons and reads (at zero temperature)

$$S = \frac{2e^3}{\pi\hbar} \vert V \vert \sum_n T_n (1 - T_n)\ .$$

It was obtained in the 1990s by Viktor Khlus, Gordey Lesovik (independently the single-channel case), and Markus Büttiker (multi-channel case). This noise is white and is always suppressed with respect to the Poisson value. The degree of suppression, $F = S/S_P$, is known as the Fano factor. Noises produced by different transport channels are independent. Fully open ($T_n=1$) and fully closed ($T_n=0$) channels produce no noise, since there are no irregularities in the electron stream.

At finite temperature, a closed expression for noise can be written as well. It interpolates between shot noise (zero temperature) and Nyquist-Johnson noise (high temperature).

==== Examples ====
- Tunnel junction is characterized by low transmission in all transport channels, therefore the electron flow is Poissonian, and the Fano factor equals one.
- Quantum point contact is characterized by an ideal transmission in all open channels, therefore it does not produce any noise, and the Fano factor equals zero. The exception is the step between plateaus, when one of the channels is partially open and produces noise.
- A metallic diffusive wire has a Fano factor of 1/3 regardless of the geometry and the details of the material.
- In 2DEG exhibiting fractional quantum Hall effect electric current is carried by quasiparticles moving at the sample edge whose charge is a rational fraction of the electron charge. The first direct measurement of their charge was through the shot noise in the current.

=== Photodetectors ===
The mean number of incident photons in time interval $\Delta t$ on a photodetector is
$$\bar{N} = \frac {P \, \Delta t} {\frac {hc}{\lambda}}$$

where c is the speed of light, h is the Planck constant, P is the average power, and $\lambda$ is the photon wavelength. Following Poisson statistics, the standard deviation of photon number is
$$\sigma_N = \sqrt {\bar{N}}$$

The spectral density ($W^2/Hz$) of shot noise limited light is

$S(f) = 2 \frac{hc}{\lambda} P$

The SNR for a CCD camera can be calculated from the following equation:
$$\mathrm{SNR} = \frac {I\cdot QE\cdot t} {\sqrt {I\cdot QE\cdot t + N_d\cdot t + N_r^2}},$$
where:

- I = photon flux (photons/pixel/second),
- QE = quantum efficiency,
- t = integration time (seconds),
- N_{d} = dark current (electrons/pixel/sec),
- N_{r} = read noise (electrons).

=== Optics ===
In optics, shot noise describes the fluctuations of the number of photons detected (or simply counted in the abstract) because they occur independently of each other. This is therefore another consequence of discretization, in this case of the energy in the electromagnetic field in terms of photons. In the case of photon detection, the relevant process is the random conversion of photons into photo-electrons for instance, thus leading to a larger effective shot noise level when using a detector with a quantum efficiency below unity. Only in an exotic squeezed coherent state can the number of photons measured per unit time have fluctuations smaller than the square root of the expected number of photons counted in that period of time. Of course there are other mechanisms of noise in optical signals which often dwarf the contribution of shot noise. When these are absent, however, optical detection is said to be "photon noise limited" as only the shot noise (also known as "quantum noise" or "photon noise" in this context) remains.

Shot noise is easily observable in the case of photomultipliers and avalanche photodiodes used in the Geiger mode, where individual photon detections are observed. However the same noise source is present with higher light intensities measured by any photo detector, and is directly measurable when it dominates the noise of the subsequent electronic amplifier. Just as with other forms of shot noise, the fluctuations in a photo-current due to shot noise scale as the square-root of the average intensity:

$$(\Delta I)^2 \ \stackrel{\mathrm{def}}{=}\   \langle\left(I-\langle I\rangle
\right)^2\rangle \propto I.$$

The shot noise of a coherent optical beam (having no other noise sources) is a fundamental physical phenomenon, reflecting quantum fluctuations in the electromagnetic field. In optical homodyne detection, the shot noise in the photodetector can be attributed to either the zero point fluctuations of the quantised electromagnetic field, or to the discrete nature of the photon absorption process. However, shot noise itself is not a distinctive feature of quantised field and can also be explained through semiclassical theory. What the semiclassical theory does not predict, however, is the squeezing of shot noise. Shot noise also sets a lower bound on the noise introduced by quantum amplifiers which preserve the phase of an optical signal.

== See also ==
- Johnson–Nyquist noise or thermal noise
- 1/f noise
- Burst noise
- Contact resistance
- Image noise
- Quantum efficiency
- Dark current (physics)
