= Effective input noise temperature =

In telecommunications, effective input noise temperature is the source noise temperature in a two-port network or amplifier that will result in the same output noise power, when connected to a noise-free network or amplifier, as that of the actual network or amplifier connected to a noise-free source. If F is the noise factor numeric and 290 K the standard noise temperature, then the effective noise temperature is given by T _{n} = 290(F − 1).
