= Circuit noise level =

At any point in a transmission system, the ratio of the circuit noise at that point to an arbitrary level chosen as a reference.

The circuit noise level is usually expressed in dBrn0, signifying the reading of a circuit noise meter, or in dBa0, signifying the circuit noise meter reading adjusted to represent an interfering effect under specified conditions.

This article incorporates public domain material from Federal Standard 1037C. General Services Administration. Archived from the original on 2022-01-22. (in support of MIL-STD-188).
