= Flicker noise =

Type of electronic noise

Flicker noise is a type of electronic noise with a 1/f power spectral density. It is therefore often referred to as 1/f noise or pink noise, though these terms have wider definitions. It occurs in almost all electronic devices and can show up with a variety of other effects, such as impurities in a conductive channel, generation and recombination noise in a transistor due to base current, and so on.

== Properties ==
1/f noise in current or voltage is usually related to a direct current, as resistance fluctuations are transformed to voltage or current fluctuations by Ohm's law. There is also a 1/f component in resistors with no direct current through them, likely due to temperature fluctuations modulating the resistance. This effect is not present in manganin, as it has negligible temperature coefficient of resistance.

In electronic devices, it shows up as a low-frequency phenomenon, as the higher frequencies are overshadowed by white noise from other sources. In oscillators, however, the low-frequency noise can be mixed up to frequencies close to the carrier, which results in oscillator phase noise.

Its contribution to total noise is characterized by the corner frequency f_{c} between the low-frequency region dominated by flicker noise and the higher-frequency region dominated by the flat spectrum of white noise. MOSFETs have a high f_{c} (can be in the GHz range). JFETs and BJTs have a lower f_{c} around 1 kHz, but JFETs usually exhibit more flicker noise at low frequencies than BJTs, and can have f_{c} as high as several kHz in JFETs not selected for flicker noise.

It typically has a Gaussian distribution and is time-reversible. It is generated by a linear mechanism in resistors and FETs, but by a non-linear mechanism in BJTs and diodes.

The spectral density of flicker-noise voltage in MOSFETs as a function of frequency f is often modeled as $\tfrac{K}{C_\text{ox}\cdot W L f}$, where K is the process-dependent constant, $C_\text{ox}$ is the oxide capacitance, W and L are channel width and length respectively. This is an empirical model and generally thought to be an oversimplification.

Flicker noise is found in carbon-composition resistors and in thick-film resistors, where it is referred to as excess noise, since it increases the overall noise level above the thermal noise level, which is present in all resistors. In contrast, wire-wound resistors have the least amount of flicker noise. Since flicker noise is related to the level of DC, if the current is kept low, thermal noise will be the predominant effect in the resistor, and the type of resistor used may not affect noise levels, depending on the frequency window.

== Measurement ==
The measurement of 1/f noise spectrum in voltage or current is done in the same way as the measurement of other types of noises. Sampling spectrum analyzers take a finite-time sample from the noise and calculate the Fourier transform by FFT algorithm. Then, after calculating the squared absolute value of the Fourier spectrum, they calculate its average value by repeating this sampling process by a sufficiently large number of times. The resulting pattern is proportional to the power-density spectrum of the measured noise. It is then normalized by the duration of the finite-time sample and also by a numerical constant in the order of 1 to get its exact value. This procedure gives correct spectral data only deeply within the frequency window determined by the reciprocal of the duration of the finite-time sample (low-frequency end) and the digital sampling rate of the noise (high-frequency end). Thus the upper and the lower half decades of the obtained power density spectrum are usually discarded from the spectrum. Conventional spectrum analyzers that sweep a narrow filtered band over the signal have good signal-to-noise ratio (SNR), since they are narrow-band instruments. These instruments do not operate at frequencies low enough to fully measure flicker noise. Sampling instruments are broadband, and hence high noise. They reduce the noise by taking multiple sample traces and averaging them. Conventional spectrum analyzers still have better SNR due to their narrow-band acquisition.

== Removal in instrumentation and measurements ==
For DC measurements 1/f noise can be particularly troublesome, as it is very significant at low frequencies, tending to infinity with integration/averaging at DC. At very low frequencies, you can think of the noise as becoming drift, although the mechanisms causing drift are usually distinct from flicker noise.

One powerful technique involves moving the signal of interest to a higher frequency and using a phase-sensitive detector to measure it. For example, the signal of interest can be chopped with a frequency. Now the signal chain carries an AC, not DC, signal. AC-coupled stages filters out the DC component; this also attenuates the flicker noise. A synchronous detector that samples the peaks of the AC signal, which are equivalent to the original DC value. In other words, first the low-frequency signal is shifted to high frequency by multiplying it with high-frequency carrier, and it is given to the device affected by the flicker noise. The output of the device is again multiplied with the same carrier, so the previous information signal comes back to baseband, and flicker noise will be shifted to higher frequency, which can easily be filtered out.

== See also ==
- Aldert van der Ziel
- Colors of noise
- Contact resistance
- Noise (physics)
- Electronic noise
- Tweedie distribution
- Chopper (electronics)

== Notes ==
- Johnson, J. B. (1925). "The Schottky effect in low frequency circuits". Physical Review. 26 (1): 71–85. Bibcode:1925PhRv...26...71J. doi:10.1103/PhysRev.26.71.
- Schottky, W. (1918). "Über spontane Stromschwankungen in verschiedenen Elektrizitätsleitern". Annalen der Physik. 362 (23): 541–567. Bibcode:1918AnP...362..541S. doi:10.1002/andp.19183622304.
- Schottky, W. (1922). "Zur Berechnung und Beurteilung des Schroteffektes". Annalen der Physik. 373 (10): 157–176. Bibcode:1922AnP...373..157S. doi:10.1002/andp.19223731007.
