= Noise power =

Various measures in telecommunications

In telecommunications, the term noise power has the following meanings:

1. The measured total noise in a given bandwidth at the input or output of a device when the signal is not present; the integral of noise spectral density over the bandwidth.
2. The power generated by a random electromagnetic process.
3. Interfering and unwanted power in an electrical device or system.
4. In the acceptance testing of radio transmitters, the mean power supplied to the antenna transmission line by a radio transmitter when loaded with noise having a Gaussian amplitude-vs.-frequency distribution.

Thermal noise power can be calculated by multiplying the noise spectral density with the signal bandwidth
$$N_\text{p} = k_\text{B}TB,$$
where:

- k_{B} is the Boltzmann constant ≈ 1.38×10^{−23} J⋅K^{−1};
- T is the absolute temperature of the device; and
- B is the bandwidth.
