= Antenna temperature =

Antenna temperature may refer to:

- Antenna noise temperature
- Antenna gain-to-noise-temperature
