= Excess noise ratio =

In electronics, excess noise ratio is a characteristic of a noise generator such as a "noise diode", that is used to measure the noise performance of amplifiers. The Y-factor method is a common measurement technique for this purpose.

By using a noise diode, the output noise of an amplifier is measured using two input noise levels, and by measuring the output noise factor (referred to as Y) the noise figure of the amplifier can be determined without having to measure the amplifier gain.

== Background ==
Any amplifier generates noise. In a radio receiver the first stage dominates the overall noise of the receiver and in most cases thermal, or Johnson noise, determines the overall noise performance of a receiver. As radio signals decrease in size, the noise at the input of the receiver will determine a lower threshold of what can be received. The level of noise is determined by calculating the noise in a 50 ohm resistor at the input of the receiver as follows:

P_{av} = kTB

where:

k = Boltzmann constant = 1.38 × 10^{−23} J/K
T = Temperature
B = Bandwidth

Thus, receivers with a narrow bandwidth have a higher sensitivity than receivers with a large bandwidth and input noise can be decreased by cooling the receiver input stage.

A noise diode is a device which has a defined excess noise ratio (ENR).

When the diode is off (unpowered) the noise from it will be thermal noise defined by the above formula. The bandwidth to be used is the bandwidth of the receiver.

When the diode is on (powered) the noise from it will be increased from the thermal noise by the diode's excess noise ratio. This figure could be 6 dB for testing an amplifier with 40 dB gain and could be 16 dB for an amplifier with less gain or higher noise.

To determine the noise figure of an amplifier one uses a noise diode at the input to the amplifier and determines the output noise Y with the diode switched on and off.

Knowing both Y and the ENR, one can then determine the amount of noise contributed by the amplifier and hence can calculate the noise figure of the amplifier.

Other techniques exist for making this measurement but either require accurate measurements of impedance or are inaccurate.

The following formula relates Y-factor to ENR:

$$\mathit{NF}=10\log_{10}\frac{10^{(\mathit{ENR}/10)}}{10^{(Y/10)} -1}$$

== Measurements ==
Noise figure measurements can be made with a noise diode, a power supply for the noise diode, and a spectrum analyser. They can also be made with a specialist noise figure meter. The advantage of the noise figure meter is that it will automatically switch the noise diode on and off, giving a continuous reading of Y; it will also have the correct bandwidths in its receiver to average the received noise in an optimum fashion. However, accurate noise figure measurements are possible with the noise figure meter and a spectrum analyser.
