= Noise generator =

Circuit that produces electrical noise

Zener-diode-based noise source

A noise generator is a circuit that produces electrical noise (that is, a random signal). Noise generators are used to test signals for measuring noise figure, frequency response, and other parameters. Noise generators are also used for generating random numbers.

== Theory ==
There are several circuits used for noise generation, including temperature-controlled resistors, temperature-limited vacuum diodes, Zener diodes, and gas discharge tubes. A source that can be switched on and off ("gated") is beneficial for some test methods.

Noise generators usually rely on a fundamental noise process such as thermal noise or shot noise.

== Thermal noise generator ==
Thermal noise can be a fundamental standard. A resistor at a certain temperature has a thermal noise associated with it. A noise generator might have two resistors at different temperatures and switch between the two resistors. The resulting output power is low. (For a 1 kΩ resistor at room temperature and a 10 kHz bandwidth, the RMS noise voltage is 400 nV.)

== Shot noise generator ==
When electrons flow across a barrier, they have discrete arrival times. Those discrete arrivals exhibit shot noise. The output noise level of a shot-noise generator is easily set by the DC bias current. Typically, the barrier in a diode is used.

Different noise-generator circuits use different methods of setting the DC bias current.

=== Vacuum diode ===
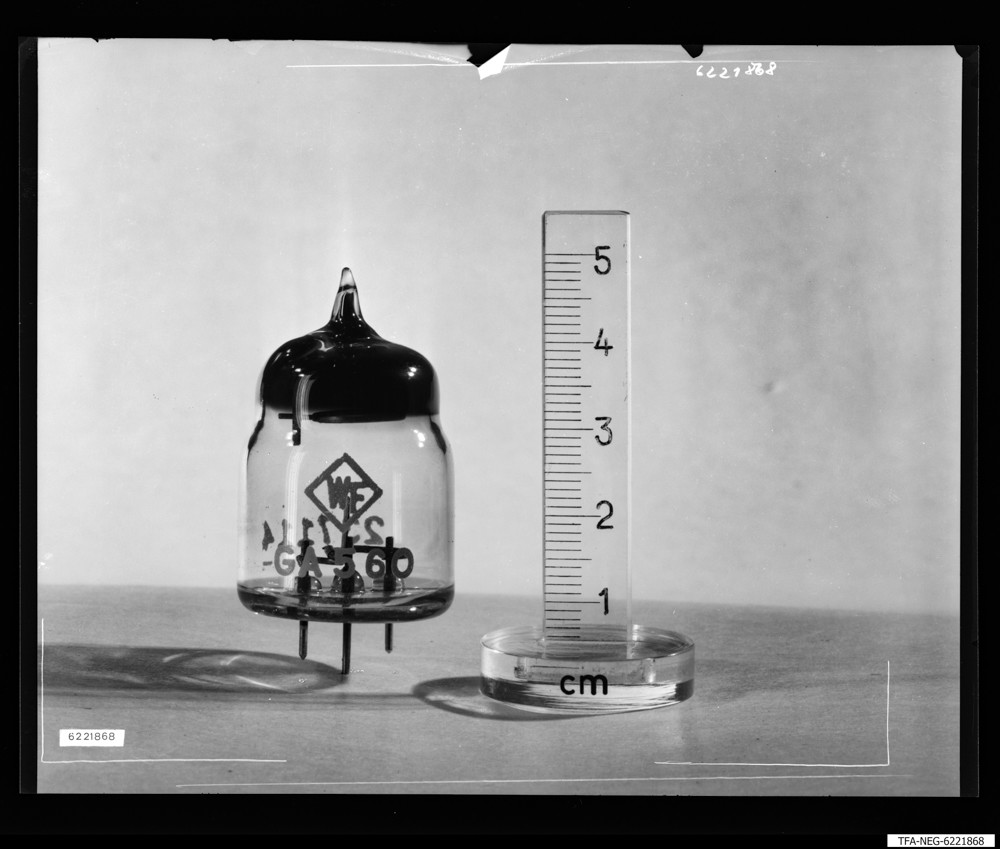
Vacuum diode designed for noise generators (1962)

One common noise source was a thermally-limited (saturated-emission) hot-cathode vacuum-tube diode. These sources could serve as white-noise generators from a few kilohertz through UHF and were available in normal radio-tube glass envelopes. Flicker (1/f) noise limited application at lower frequencies; electron transit time limited application at higher frequencies. The basic design was a diode vacuum tube with a heated filament. The temperature of the cathode (filament) sets the anode (plate) current that determines the shot noise; see Richardson equation. The anode voltage is set large enough to collect all the electrons emitted by the filament. If the plate voltage were too low, then there would be space charge near the filament that would affect the noise output. For a calibrated generator, care must be taken so that the shot noise dominates the thermal noise of the tube's plate resistance and other circuit elements.

=== Gas-discharge tubes ===
Long, thin, hot-cathode gas-discharge glass tubes fitted with a normal bayonet light bulb mount for the filament and an anode top cap were used for SHF frequencies and diagonal insertion into a waveguide. They were filled with a pure inert gas such as neon because mixtures made the output temperature-dependent. Their burning voltage was under 200 V, but they needed optical priming (pre-ionizing) by a 2-Watt incandescent lamp prior to ignition by an anode voltage spike in the 5 kV range.

For lower-frequency noise bands, glow lamps filled with neon have been used. The circuit was similar to the one for spike / needle pulses.

One miniature thyratron found an additional use as a noise source, when operated as a diode (grid tied to cathode) in a transverse magnetic field.

=== Forward-biased semiconductor diode ===
Another possibility is using the collector current in a transistor.

=== Reverse-biased semiconductor diode ===
Reverse-biased diodes in breakdown can also be used as shot-noise sources. Voltage-regulator diodes are common, but there are two different breakdown mechanisms, and they have different noise characteristics. The mechanisms are the Zener effect and avalanche breakdown.

==== Zener diode ====
The Zener effect is primarily exhibited by reverse-biased diodes and bipolar transistor base-emitter junctions that breakdown below about 7 volts. The breakdown is due to internal field emission, since the junctions are thin, and the electric field is high. Zener-type breakdown is shot noise. The flicker (1/f) noise corner can be below 10 Hz.

The noise generated by Zener diodes is a simple shot noise.

==== Avalanche diode ====
For breakdown voltages greater than 7 volts, the semiconductor junction width is thicker and primary breakdown mechanism is an avalanche. The noise output is more complicated. There is excess noise (that is, noise over and above the simple shot noise) because there is avalanche multiplication.

For higher-power-output noise generators, amplification is needed. For broadband noise generators, that amplification can be difficult to achieve. One method uses avalanche multiplication within the same barrier that generates the noise. In an avalanche, one carrier collides with other atoms and knocks free new carriers. The result is that, for each carrier that starts across a barrier, several carriers synchronously arrive. The result is a wide-bandwidth high-power source. Conventional diodes can be used in breakdown.

The avalanche breakdown also has multistate noise. The noise output power randomly switches among several output levels. Multistate noise looks somewhat like flicker (1/f) noise. The effect is process dependent, but it can be minimized. Diodes may also be selected for low multistate noise.

A commercial example of an avalanche diode noise generator is the Agilent 346C that covers 10 MHz to 26.5 GHz.

== See also ==
- Excess noise ratio
- Noise figure meter
- Radio noise source
