= MHA =

MHA may refer to:

== Organizations ==
- Malaysian Highway Authority, a government agency under the Malaysian Ministry of Works
- Malta Handball Association, the governing body of handball in Malta
- Manitoba Hockey Association, an early Canadian ice hockey league
- Member of the House of Assembly, a legislative assembly member in parts of Australia and Canada
- Mandan, Hidatsa, and Arikara Nation, a Northern Plains Native American tribe
- Ministry of home affairs, a government department in some countries
- Mormon History Association, a nonprofit organization promoting research and publication
- Methodist Homes for the Aged, cares for older people and is part of MHA Care Group

== Science and technology ==
- Mast Head Amplifier, an amplifier (LNA) mounted as close as practical to the antenna
- May–Hegglin anomaly, a genetic disorder affecting the blood platelets
- Microangiopathic hemolytic anemia, a type of anemia, more commonly abbreviated MAHA
- Maximum holding airspeed, aviation airspeed for holding patterns
- Minimum holding altitude, an aviation term, see holding

== Other uses ==
- Master of Health Administration, a degree awarded by many American, European and Australian universities
- Mental Health Act, stock short title used for legislation relating to mental health law
- Mueller–Hinton agar, an agar of beef infusion, peptone, and starch used primarily for antibiotic susceptibility testing
- My Hero Academia, a Japanese manga and anime series, usually abbreviated to HeroAca
