= Radio noise source =

Device generating calibrated broadband noise for RF and microwave measurements

A radio noise source is a device that generates broadband electrical noise at a precisely known and calibrated level across a range of radio and microwave frequencies. Radio noise sources are used primarily as reference standards in the measurement of the noise figure of amplifiers, radio receivers, mixers, and other two-port RF components. They are also used to calibrate radio telescopes and radiometers. The output of a noise source is characterised by its excess noise ratio (ENR), which expresses how much its output noise power exceeds the thermal noise floor at the standard reference temperature of 290 K.

Commercial noise sources for noise figure measurement typically take the form of a coaxial module containing an avalanche diode and a precision attenuator. A DC bias voltage switches the diode between two states: the on (hot) state, in which avalanche breakdown generates intense broadband noise, and the off (cold) state, in which only the thermal noise of the attenuator is present. The ratio of output noise power in these two states is the basis of the Y-factor measurement technique.

== Background ==
=== Thermal noise ===
All resistive conductors generate random voltage fluctuations owing to the thermal agitation of charge carriers. This phenomenon, known as Johnson–Nyquist noise or thermal noise, was measured experimentally by John B. Johnson at Bell Labs in 1926 and given a theoretical foundation by Harry Nyquist in his 1928 paper "Thermal Agitation of Electric Charge in Conductors." The available noise power from a resistive source is:

P = kTB

where k is the Boltzmann constant (1.381 × 10^{−23} J/K), T is absolute temperature in Kelvin, and B is bandwidth in hertz. At the IEEE standard reference temperature of 290 K, the thermal noise power density is −174 dBm/Hz in a 50-Ω system. This floor is the baseline against which a noise source's output is compared.

=== Shot noise and avalanche noise ===
Shot noise arises from the discrete, quantised nature of electric charge crossing a potential barrier such as a p–n junction. The spectral density of the noise current is S_{I} = 2eI, where e is the elementary charge and I is the mean DC current through the junction. This relationship was first derived by Walter Schottky in 1918.

Avalanche noise occurs when a reverse-biased p-n junction is driven into avalanche breakdown. Carriers accelerated by the strong electric field generate additional electron–hole pairs through impact ionization, producing a multiplication of current fluctuations that greatly exceeds ordinary shot noise in intensity. Modern radio noise sources exploit this effect: an avalanche diode biased into breakdown produces wideband, nearly spectrally flat noise at a level far above the thermal floor.

== Types of radio noise sources ==
=== Thermal noise sources ===
A resistive termination at a controlled physical temperature produces thermal noise whose power P = kTB is determinable from the temperature alone. Two variants are common in practice:

- Ambient-temperature load: A well-matched 50-Ω termination at room temperature (~290 K) is used as a stable cold noise reference.
- Cryogenic termination: A 50-Ω load cooled to liquid nitrogen temperature (~77 K) or liquid helium temperature (~4 K) provides a very low noise temperature. Cryogenic terminations serve as primary noise standards at national metrology laboratories, including NIST, and as cold references for calibrating radio astronomy receivers.

The hot/cold pair consisting of an ambient load and a liquid-nitrogen-cooled load is widely used in radio astronomy to calibrate receiver noise temperature directly from the formula T_{rx} = (T_{hot} − Y × T_{cold}) / (Y − 1), where Y is the ratio of output noise powers.

=== Gas discharge noise sources ===
Gas discharge tubes filled with noble gases such as neon, argon, or helium were the dominant microwave noise source technology from the 1940s through the 1970s. When an ionising DC voltage is applied, the discharge produces broadband noise extending to approximately 3 GHz. The noise output was stable with temperature only when pure inert gases, rather than mixtures, were used as the fill. A small incandescent lamp mounted near the tube provided optical pre-ionisation to ensure reliable ignition and consistent output.

Hewlett-Packard's Model 340A noise-figure meter, introduced in 1958, used gas discharge noise sources. Its successor, the HP 342A (introduced 1959), employed calibrated argon or neon gas discharge tubes for microwave bands and a thermally-limited vacuum diode for lower RF frequencies; it remained in the HP catalog until 1981.

=== Avalanche diode noise sources ===
The modern standard for RF and microwave noise sources employs a reverse-biased avalanche diode housed with a precision coaxial attenuator in a 50-Ω coaxial package. The attenuator reduces the output noise level to the target ENR value, absorbs impedance mismatch between the diode and the output port, and presents a stable 50-Ω source impedance in both the on and off states. When a bias voltage (typically +28 V DC) is applied, the diode enters avalanche breakdown and produces broadband noise (on state); with bias removed, the output is the thermal noise of the attenuator alone (off state).

The noise spectrum is nearly flat from a few megahertz to tens of gigahertz, depending on diode design and packaging. Calibrated ENR values as a function of frequency are supplied by the manufacturer, and in many modern products are stored in a memory chip embedded in the module for automatic readout by a connected noise figure analyzer. Representative examples include the Keysight 346A (10 MHz to 18 GHz, nominal ENR 6 dB), 346B (10 MHz to 18 GHz, nominal ENR 15 dB), and 346C (10 MHz to 26.5 GHz, nominal ENR 15 dB).

== Excess noise ratio ==
The excess noise ratio (ENR) is the primary specification of a radio noise source. It is defined as the ratio of the additional noise power provided by the source in its on state above the thermal noise floor at the standard reference temperature T_{0} = 290 K:

$$\mathrm{ENR} = \frac{T_\mathrm{on} - T_\mathrm{off}}{T_0}$$

Expressed in decibels:

$$\mathrm{ENR\,(dB)} = 10\log_{10}\!\left(\frac{T_\mathrm{on} - T_\mathrm{off}}{T_0}\right)$$

where T_{on} is the equivalent noise temperature of the source in its on state, T_{off} is the noise temperature in the off state (ideally 290 K for a source at room temperature), and T_{0} = 290 K.

Typical ENR values for commercial avalanche diode sources are approximately 5–6 dB for measuring low-noise devices and 15 dB for general-purpose noise figure work. A practical guideline is that the noise source ENR should be within roughly 10 dB of the noise figure of the device under test; a large mismatch degrades the accuracy of the Y-factor measurement.

== Y-factor measurement method ==
The Y-factor method is the standard technique for measuring noise figure using a calibrated noise source. The procedure is as follows:

1. Connect the noise source to the input of the device under test (DUT).
2. Measure the output noise power with the source switched on: P_{on}.
3. Measure the output noise power with the source switched off: P_{off}.
4. Compute the Y-factor: Y = P_{on} / P_{off}.
5. Calculate noise figure: NF (dB) = ENR (dB) − 10 log_{10}(Y − 1).

Because only a power ratio is needed, the Y-factor method does not require absolute power calibration of the measuring instrument. The noise source is switched under instrument control, and noise figure is computed from the measured ratio and the stored ENR data.

The concept of noise figure was defined by Harald T. Friis in his 1944 paper "Noise Figures of Radio Receivers," published in the Proceedings of the IRE. Friis also derived the formula for cascaded stages, showing that the noise contribution of the first amplifier stage dominates the noise performance of a receiver chain — a result that made accurate noise figure measurement of front-end components of fundamental importance to receiver design.

Dedicated noise figure analyzers automate noise source switching and the computation of noise figure and noise temperature across a programmed frequency range. The Hewlett-Packard 8970A, introduced in 1983, was a widely adopted instrument of this class; its successors include the Keysight N8975A series.

== Applications ==
=== Noise figure measurement ===
Noise figure measurement is the primary application of radio noise sources. Using the Y-factor method, noise sources enable characterisation of the noise performance of low-noise amplifiers, mixers, RF front ends, complete receiver chains, and passive two-port networks. Accurate noise figure data is essential in the design of communication receivers, radar systems, electronic warfare equipment, and radio astronomy instrumentation.

=== Radiometer and radio telescope calibration ===
Radiometers and radio telescope receivers inject calibration noise signals to track gain variations in the receiver chain. The Dicke radiometer, introduced by Robert H. Dicke in 1946, was the first system to use a periodically switched noise reference to stabilise radiometer output against gain drifts. In modern radio astronomy front-ends, a calibration noise diode injects a known noise signal through a directional coupler (typically at −20 to −25 dB coupling) ahead of the first low-noise amplifier, enabling real-time monitoring and correction of system noise temperature. Cryogenic calibration noise sources have been developed for large telescope arrays such as the Square Kilometre Array.

=== Broadband frequency response measurement ===
A wideband noise source at a device's input, with a spectrum analyzer at its output, can display the frequency response of the device over a wide bandwidth in a single sweep, providing an alternative to a tracking generator for scalar frequency response measurements.

=== Additive white Gaussian noise testing ===
Additive white Gaussian noise (AWGN) generators — instruments that combine noise source technology with variable-level output — are used in communications testing to simulate broadband interference or a noisy channel. Applications include sensitivity testing of cable television receivers, digital television tuners, and modem front ends.

=== Hardware random number generation ===
Noise diodes serve as entropy sources in hardware random number generators for cryptographic and security applications, exploiting the physically random nature of avalanche breakdown.

== History ==
The earliest RF noise sources were saturated-emission hot-cathode vacuum diodes. In thermal saturation, all emitted electrons are collected by the anode, and the anode current carries full shot noise with spectral density S_{I} = 2eI. These devices operated from audio frequencies through UHF but were limited to approximately 300 MHz and required high anode voltages.

During and after World War II, it was found that noble-gas discharge tubes produce wideband microwave noise extending to approximately 3 GHz when an ionising DC voltage is applied. Gas discharge noise sources became the standard for microwave noise figure measurement throughout the 1950s and 1960s; a United States patent for a gas tube noise generator was filed in March 1946. Hewlett-Packard introduced the Model 340A noise figure meter in 1958, using gas discharge sources, followed by the 342A in 1959, which remained in production until 1981.

The development of semiconductor diodes in the 1960s enabled solid-state noise sources. Zener diodes, which operate through the Zener effect at reverse breakdown voltages below approximately 7 V, generate primarily shot noise and offered improved low-frequency stability compared to gas tubes. Avalanche diodes, operating at higher reverse breakdown voltages, produce far more intense noise through impact ionisation multiplication and became the preferred technology for broadband microwave noise sources. The avalanche diode noise source housed in a precision 50-Ω coaxial package has been the industry standard for RF and microwave noise figure measurement since the 1970s and remains so today.

== See also ==
- Noise figure
- Noise-figure meter
- Y-factor
- Johnson–Nyquist noise
- Shot noise
- Dicke radiometer
- Low-noise amplifier
- Avalanche diode
