= LTZ1000 =

High-precision voltage reference

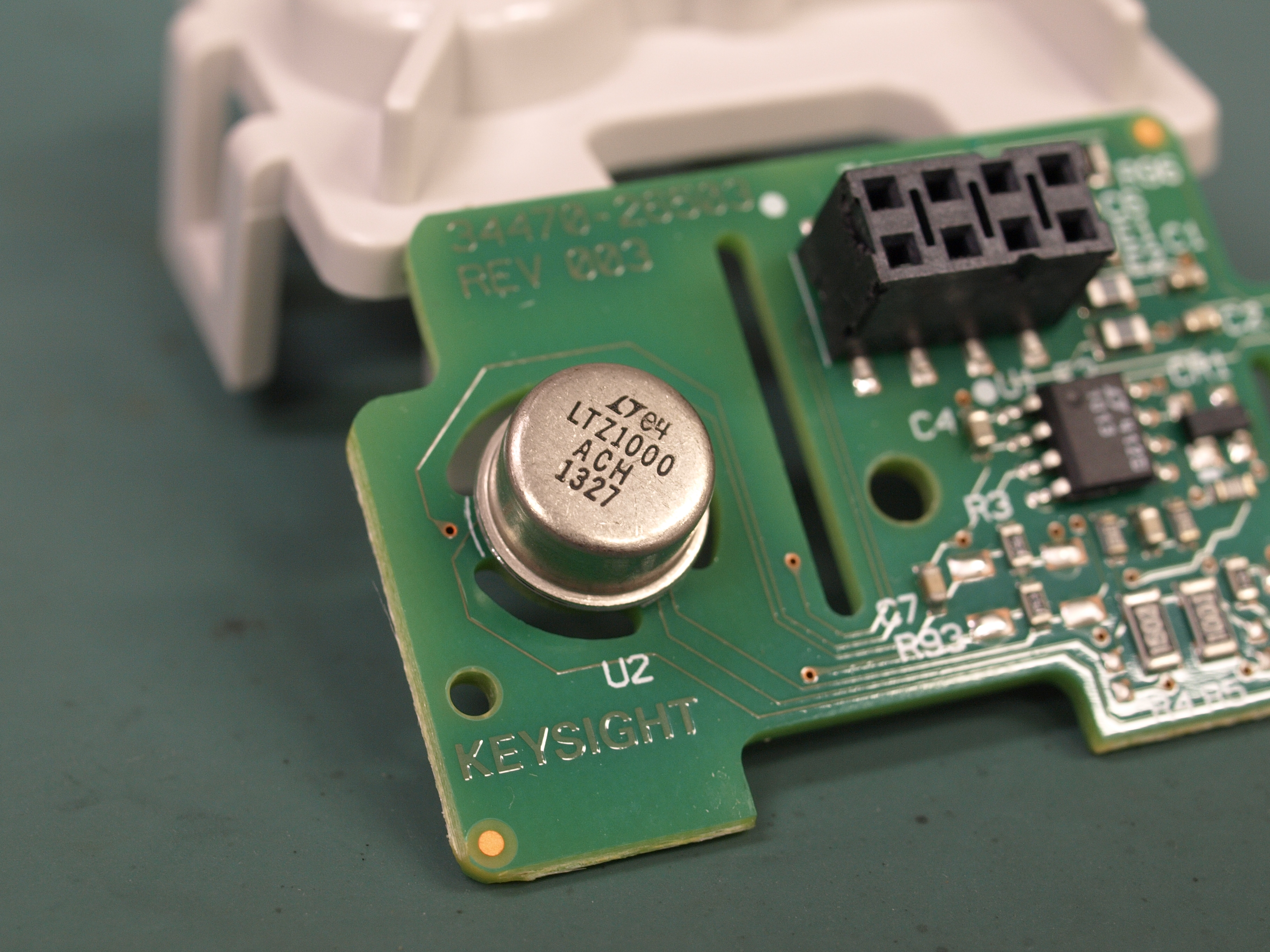
A view of the LTZ1000 voltage reference onboard the Keysight 34470A multimeter

The LTZ1000 is a high-precision, ultra-stable voltage reference originally developed by Carl Nelson for Linear Technology. It consists of a subsurface Zener diode reference packaged along with an integrated heater and temperature sensor designed to hold the device at a constant temperature for improved stability.

Since the 2016/2017 purchase of Linear Technology by Analog Devices, the LTZ1000 is still made, but there are two new similar products. The ADR1000 is a pin-compatible product with, a lower operating voltage (6.6 V vs. 7.2 V), and requiring minor changes to the supporting circuitry. The ADR1001 incorporates heater control circuitry, an output buffer, and a precision divider for producing 5.00 and 10.00 V standard voltages. These devices have improved short-term noise performance, but notably poorer long-term drift than the LTZ1000.

== Overview ==
The LTZ1000's internal reference is an Zener diode in series with a compensation transistor, which is kept at a constant temperature by an internal resistive heater. An internal sensing transistor is used by external circuitry to drive the heater and maintain the reference's constant internal temperature. Because of its high sensitivity, the LTZ1000 must be thermally isolated from the rest of the circuit and housed in an enclosure that is well shielded from air currents for optimal performance. The device's output voltage ranges from 7 to 7.5V on a chip-to-chip basis, with a noise figure of 1.2 μV peak to peak and a long-term drift of 2 μV/√kHr.

== Applications ==
The LTZ1000 is a popular reference for many high-precision metrology applications, and has served as the internal voltage reference for many high-precision devices such as the HP3458A 8½ digit multimeter and CERN's HPM7177 8½ digit voltmeter, which is used in the Large Hadron Collider. It is also very popular among hobbyists seeking to produce their own voltage references for calibrating equipment or obtaining highly precise voltage measurements.
