= Tooway =

Satellite broadband Internet provider

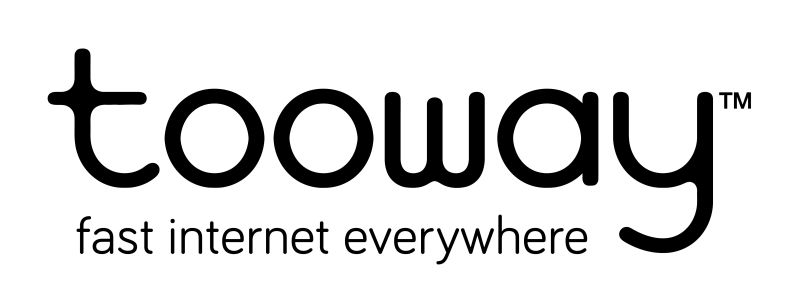
tooway logo

Tooway is a satellite broadband Internet service available across Europe. The first version of the service was launched in 2007 via two Eutelsat geostationary satellites, Hot Bird 6 and Eurobird 3, respectively at the 13° and 33° East orbital positions.

At the end of 2010, Eutelsat launched KA-SAT, the first European High Throughput Satellite to operate in K_{a} band. KA-SAT was positioned at 9° East, and delivers Internet access and broadcast services toward Europe and the Mediterranean Basin. Commercial service started on KA-SAT at the end of May 2011. Tooway services over KA-SAT satellite provide up to 50 Mbit/s downstream and up to 6 Mbit/s upstream.

== Services ==
Tooway makes use of the Internet Protocol over satellite to provide consumers across Europe and the Mediterranean Basin with Internet access. Unlike services relying on terrestrial infrastructures (such as cable or ADSL), satellites provide service in wide coverage areas as broad as a continent.

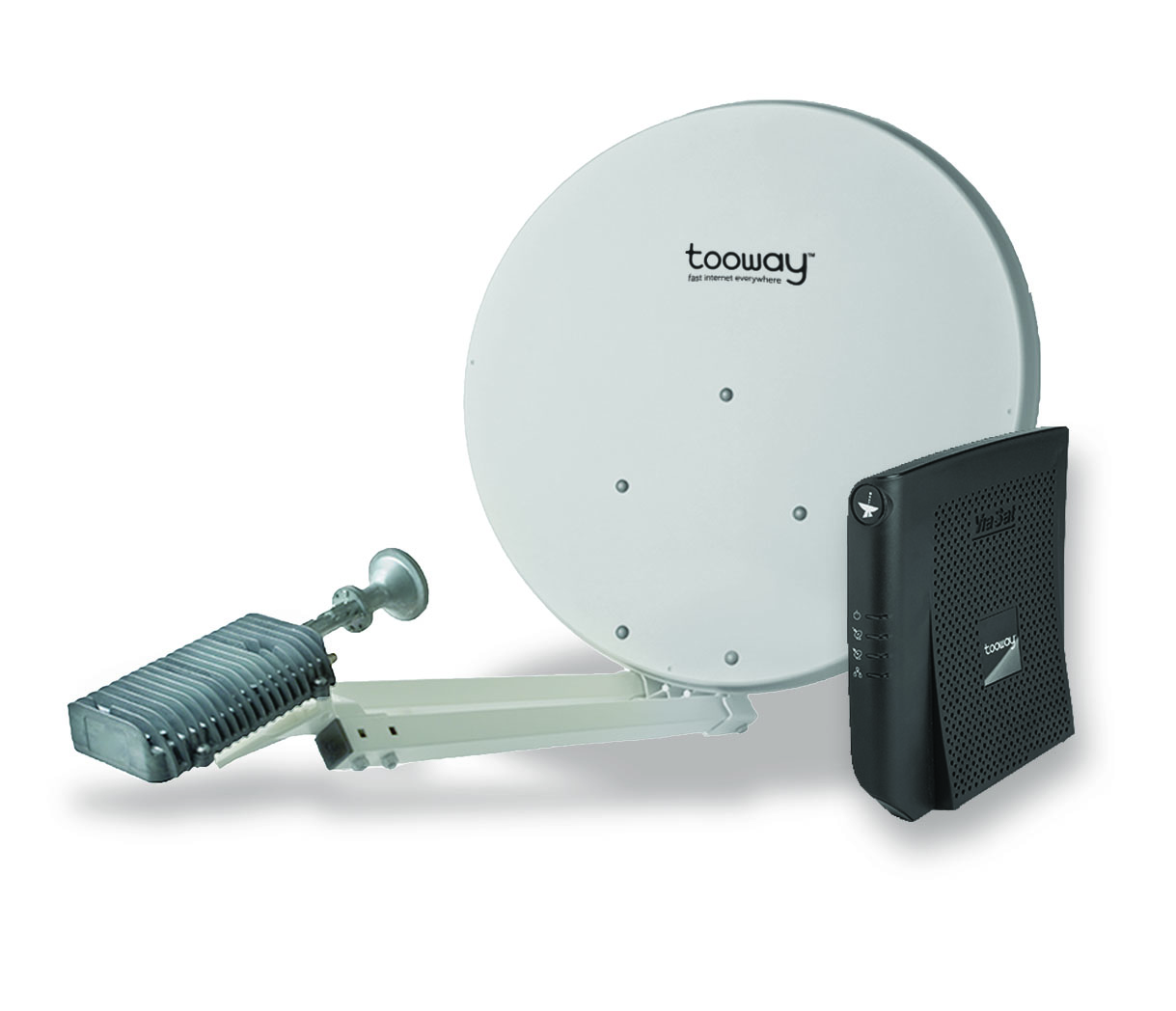
Most recent tooway antenna and modem for the connection with KA-SAT satellite

Terrestrial wireless broadband technologies focus on dense urban centers and leave consumers outside these areas with narrowband connections or no connection at all. Unserved and unsatisfied users were estimated to reach 30 million households in Western and Eastern Europe by 2010.

Tooway services operate over K_{a} band and K_{u} band via Eutelsat's geostationary satellites. This enabled bit rates of 3.6 Mbit/s downstream and 384 kbit/s upstream in 2009. Service differentiation is done on volume consumption per month through a Fair Access Policy. When consumption is above volume thresholds, the service remains available but at lower speeds.

Tooway also provides a Voice over IP service for voice telephone calls over the Internet.

In mid-2011, commercial use of KA-SAT with the SurfBeam 2 system from ViaSat allowed higher bit-rates and volumes at the same price over the European coverage area. Tooway service over KA-SAT satellite provides up to 50 Mbit/s downstream and up to 6 Mbit/s upstream Since KA-SAT is located at 9°E, near Eutelsat's HOT BIRD TV neighborhood (13° East), Internet Protocol services can be combined with Digital Video Broadcasting television service using a single satellite dish with two low noise block-downconverters. This means subscribers can access satellite TV channels without additional dishes. Tooway also markets IPTV services with Video on Demand and Digital video recorder features.

== Technology ==
ViaSat SurfBeam technology uses the K_{a} band, approximately twice as high in frequency as K_{u} band. This implies a smaller beam which contributes towards smaller end-user terminals.

	Uplink	Downlink
K_{a} band	27.5 GHz - 30.0 GHz	17.7 GHz - 20.2 GHz
K_{u} band	12.75 GHz - 14.5 GHz	10.7 GHz - 12.75 GHz

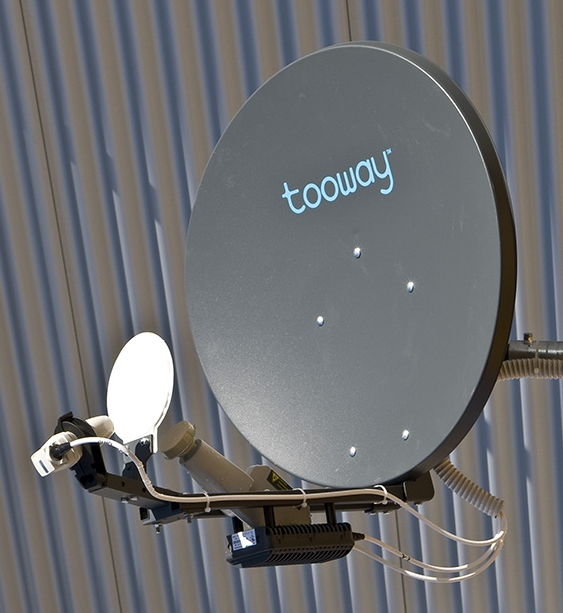
The old dual-band satellite antenna (for K_{a} and K_{u} band reception)

Smaller beams allow more efficient use of satellite power on the forward link and improved G/T (Gain-over-Temperature) on the return link. Smaller beams draw smaller cells on ground (beam footprint) which also permits more cells in a given service area, increasing frequency reuse.

K_{a} band has less interference than K_{u} band, since fewer satellites operate in this frequency.

Tooway and ViaSat SurfBeam make use of DVB-S2 Variable Coding and Modulation technologies.

Adaptive Coding and Modulation gathers fading conditions from each terminal and adapts signal encoding and modulation to each individual terminal's receiving condition. This allows efficient transmission to each terminal, without degenerating the efficiency of the whole network. A return channel on the end-user terminal is needed to send the condition changes.

Variable Coding and Modulation does not require a return channel and does not adapt to fading conditions in real-time. Instead a static efficiency is defined for each terminal according to the availability needed. This improves waveform efficiency as opposed to Constant Code and Modulation which forces to apply the worst link budget to the entire spot.

The IPTV service uses H.264 Scalable Video Coding (SVC) for video coding. SVC allows transmitting the same video coded with different resolutions or bit-rates. For example, a high definition program could be received by a terminal in clear sky conditions while the standard definition could be received by a terminal affected by fading conditions during rain. In more stringent fading conditions, a program with even lower bit-rate could use an H.264 SVC stream.

== Customer premises equipment ==
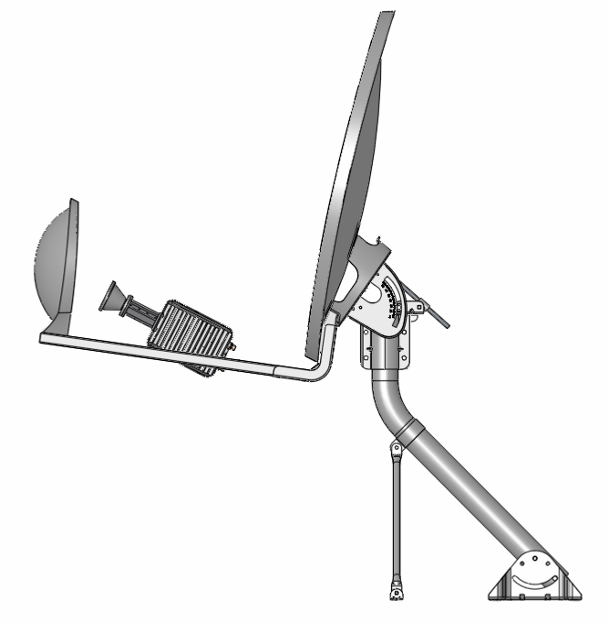
The dual-band antenna for K_{a} and K_{u} band reception (ODU)

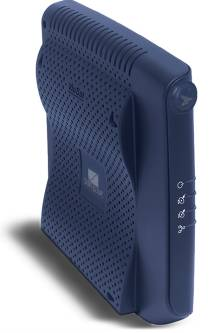
The Tooway satellite modem (IDU)

Customer equipment comprises an Outdoor Unit (ODU) and Indoor Unit (IDU). The ODU is a parabolic satellite antenna manufactured by ViaSat of typically 60–70 cm in diameter.

The ViaSat SurfBeam antenna employs a frequency selective sub-reflector that allows reflecting one range of frequency while being transparent to another range. This feature enables the reception of both interactive services in K_{a} band and broadcast services (DTH) in K_{u} band with the same ODU.

The installation of the ODU employs automated tools for simplified antenna alignment and commissioning. The installation procedure is identical anywhere within the satellite service area and the use of circular polarization further simplifies the setup which permits to reduce the time and cost of the home installation. Although the installation could be done by some advanced users, it is recommended to contact a certified Tooway installer. Poor alignment of the dish system results in higher error rates and a lower broadband speed. The relatively unique transmission system of Turbo Code 8PSK used is not recognized with standard DVB-S or DVB-S2 installation meters. Horizon Global Electronics manufactures a Test and Measurement meter specifically designed to align the Tooway dish. HD-TC8 Applied Instruments also manufactures a Test and Measurement meter, the model Super Buddy 29, designed to align the Tooway dish. Super Buddy 29 None of these two meters are able to do the new Viasat SurfBeam DVB-S2 signals. Also for these higher capacity signals and in addition on the higher K_{a} band, the accuracy of the installation becomes much more critical. Maxpeak AB (publ) manufactures a meter specifically for these new signals, SAM-plus (DVB-S2 ACM and VCM). The current KA-SAT Surfbeam TRIA (dish receiving block) incorporates an audible tuner allowing accurate pointing of the dish without any additional external meter.

The IDU is a satellite modem providing a plug-and-play Ethernet interface with DHCP. The current version is manufactured by ViaSat. A WiFi router may be connected to the satellite modem in order to deploy wireless Internet access in the home. No software is required on the computer. Recent changes (mid-2012) to the software disabled DHCP in the modem/system which means the subscriber must provide their own router with DHCP server if they use more than one device connecting to the internet.

LED indicators on the modem front inform on satellite reception and transmission statuses (RX and TX) as well as on network activities.

The IDU is connected to the ODU using two coaxial cables.

== Performance ==
Packages, called Tooway 2, 10, 25,40, Extra and Infinite, became available through service providers all over Europe in May 2014 which offer downstream rates of up to 22 Mbit/s and upstream up to 6 Mbit/s (excepting entry level service). The Small entry-level package provides bit-rates of 2 Mbit/s downstream and 1 Mbit/s upstream with a volume (FAP) of about 2GB.

The round-trip time inherent to satellite communications comes from the double hop between earth and space. All communications travel at the speed of light (approx. 300 million metres per second or 671 million miles per hour) from a terminal on ground to a satellite in geostationary orbit (approx. 36,000 km or 22,000 miles in altitude), then to another terminal on earth and back. The result is roughly a half a second round-trip time which may be unsuitable for real-time critical applications, including many games, though it is sufficient to support other applications, including (with minimal delays), VoIP.

Tooway domestic consumers are subject to a 1/50 contention rate which under peak loading, typically from 17:00 GMT onwards can result in heavily degraded performance for applications such as streaming media services which manifests as pausing, buffering and heavily pixellated pictures.

== See also ==
- ASTRA2Connect European satellite Internet service by SES
