= ENR =

ENR may refer to:

In media:

- Engineering News-Record, a weekly magazine covering the global construction industry
- Emissora Nacional de Radiodifusão, now Rádio e Televisão de Portugal, the Portuguese public service broadcasting corporation

In organizations:

- European New Right, a European political far-right movement
- Energizer Holdings, an American manufacturer that has NYSE code ENR
- Bureau of Energy Resources, in the U.S. Department of State

In transportation:

- Egyptian National Railways, the national railway in Egypt
- Esquimalt and Nanaimo Railway
- East Norfolk Railway, a former railway in the United Kingdom, now site of the heritage Bure Valley Railway
- Ennore railway station (station code), a railway station in Chennai, Tamil Nadu, India

Other:

- Enoyl-acyl carrier protein reductase, an enzyme which catalyzes an essential step in fatty acid biosynthesis
- Esercito Nazionale Repubblicano (National Republican Army), the army of the Italian Social Republic from 1943 to 1945
- Ending Net Receivable, a financial term used by certain credit card companies
- Excess Noise Ratio, in radio frequency electronics a normalized measure of how much the noise power is above the thermal noise floor
