= Tower Mounted Amplifier =

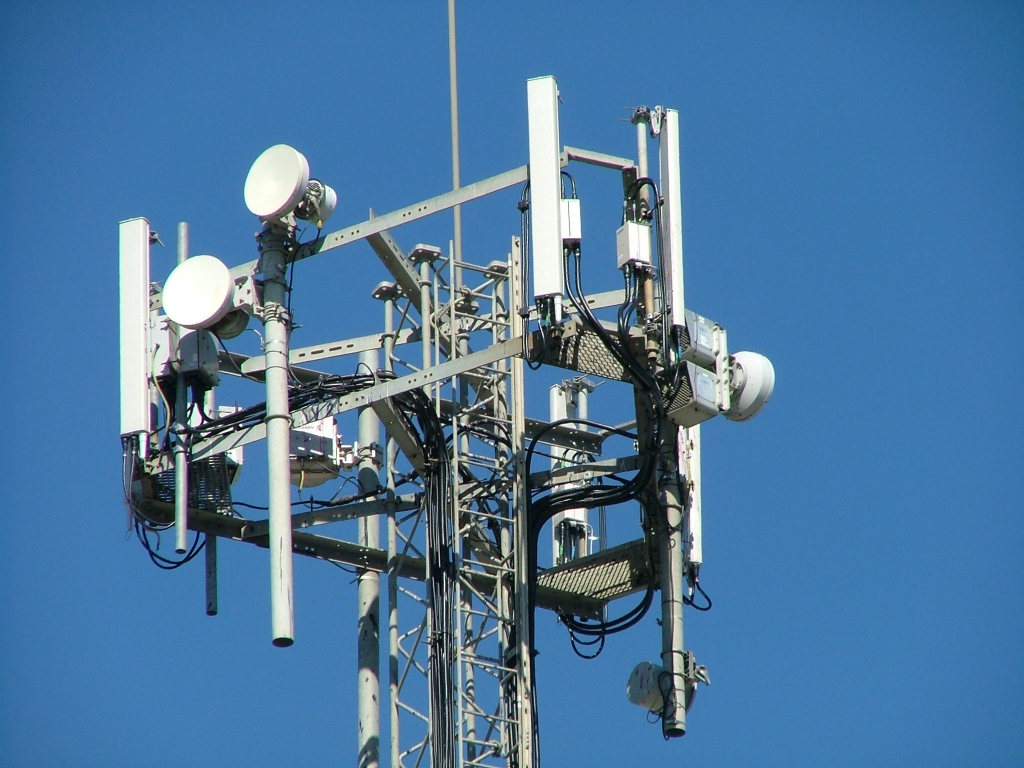
Crowded mast with TMAs (white rectangular boxes) mounted behind all the panel (rectangular) antennas

A Tower Mounted Amplifier (TMA), or Mast Head Amplifier (MHA), is a low-noise amplifier (LNA) mounted as close as practical to the antenna in mobile masts or base transceiver stations. A TMA reduces the base transceiver station noise figure (NF) and therefore improves its overall sensitivity; in other words the mobile mast is able to receive weaker signals. The power to feed the amplifier (in the top of the mast) is usually a DC component on the same coaxial cable that feeds the antenna, otherwise an extra power cable has to be run to the TMA/MHA to supply it with power.

== Benefits in mobile communications ==
In two way communications systems, there are occasions when one way, one link, is weaker than the other, normally referenced as unbalanced links. This can be fixed by making the transmitter on that link stronger or the receiver more sensitive to weaker signals.

TMAs are used in mobile networks to improve the sensitivity of the uplink in mobile phone masts. Since the transmitter in a mobile phone it cannot be easily modified to transmit stronger signals. Improving the uplink translates into a combination of better coverage and mobile transmitting at less power, which in turn implies a lower drain from its batteries, thus a longer battery charge.

There are occasions when the cable between the antenna and the receiver is so lossy (too thin or too long) that the signal weakens from the antenna before reaching the receiver; therefore it may be decided to install TMAs from the start to make the system viable. In other words, the TMA can only partially correct, or palliate, the link imbalance.

== Drawbacks/pitfalls ==
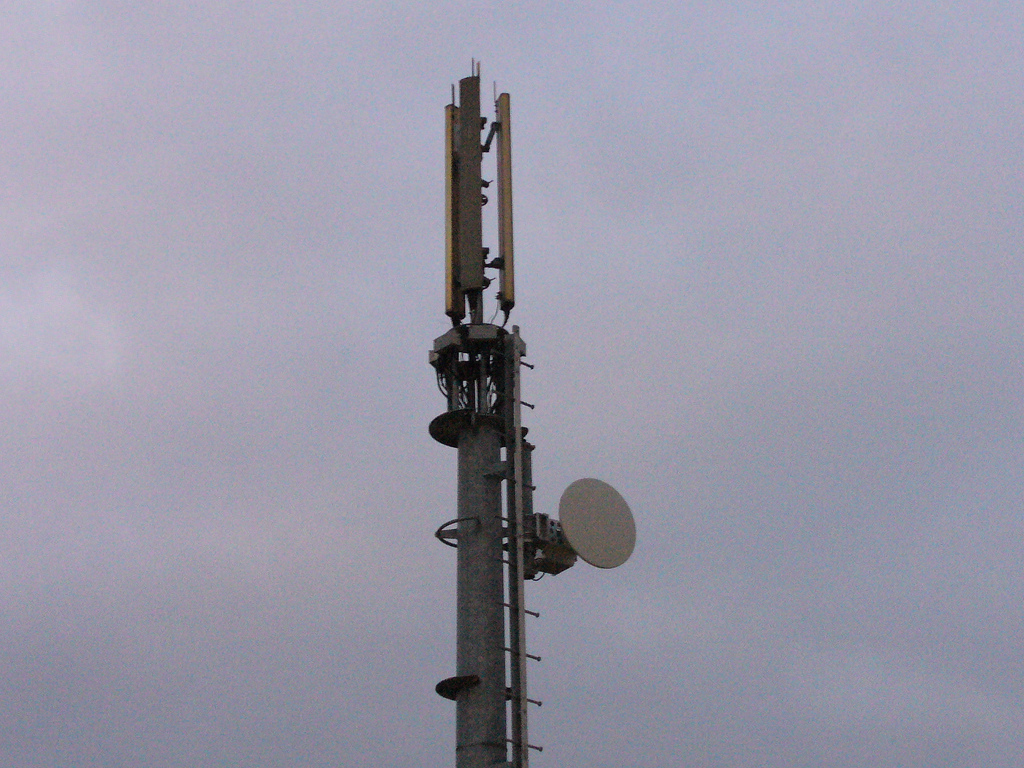
Simple phone mast with three TMAs (horizontal rectangular boxes) visible at the top of metal tower and before rectangular antennas

1. If the received signal is not weak, installing a TMA will not deliver its intended benefit.
2. If the received signal is strong enough, it may cause the TMA to create its own interference which is passed on to the receiver.
3. In some mobile networks (e.g. IS-95 or WCDMA - a.k.a. European 3G -), it is not simple to detect and correct unbalanced links since the link balance is not constant; link balance changes with traffic load. However, other mobile networks (e.g. GSM) have a constant link, therefore it is possible analyse call records and establish where TMAs are needed.
4. There might be practical room restrictions, visual, or structural weight restrictions to install a TMA at the top of a phone mast.
5. If the TMA fails, it may render the system unusable until serviced, unless it can be bypassed.
6. Servicing TMAs is harder than servicing receivers - and thus more expensive - as the TMA may be dangerously near (near field) of the antenna and high up in a tower. The receiver may alternatively be housed in a cabinet or hut at the base of the tower.

== Mathematical principles ==
In a receiver, the receiving path starts with the signal originating at the antenna. Then the signal is amplified in further stages within the receiver. It is actually not amplified all at once but in stages, with some stages producing other changes (like changing the signal's frequency).

The principle can be demonstrated mathematically; the receiver's noise figure is calculated by modularly assessing each amplifier stage. Each stage consists of a noise figure (F) and an amount of amplification, or gain (G). So amplifier number 1 will be right after the antenna and described by $F_1$ and $G_1$. The relationship of the stages is known as the Friis formula.

$System Noise Figure = F_1 + \frac{ F_2 - 1 }{ G_1 } + \frac{ F_3 - 1 }{ G_1 \times G_2 } + \cdots + \frac{ F_n - 1 }{ G_1 \times G_2 \times G_3 \times \cdots \times G_{ n-1 } }$

Note that:

1. The first amplifier will set the temperature ($F_1$); nothing reduces its contribution to the total.
2. The second amplifier's temperature ($F_2$) will also influence the total but it is reduced (divided) by the gain of the first amplifier $G_1$.
3. The third amplifier's temperature is influencing even less, as it is reduced by its preceding amplifier gains $G_1$, $G_2$.
4. And so on until N stages.

== Applying the Friis formula to TMAs ==
=== Typical receiver without TMA ===
Start with a typical receiver: Antenna - Connecting Cable (stage 1) - Receiver (stage 2).

$System Noise Figure = F_1 + \frac{ F_2 - 1 }{ G_1 }$

The first stage after the antenna is actually the connecting cable. Therefore:

- Stage 1: $F_1$ is equal to the loss of the cable and will increase with ambient temperature
- Stage 2: $G_1$ will depend on the lossiness of the cable. Since the element is lossy $G_1$ is less than one; in other words, it will increase $F_2 - 1$. The more loss, the closer $G_1$ is to zero and the more $F_2$ will increase.

What can be done to improve the receiver to pick up very weak signals? It must have a lower noise figure; that is when the TMA comes into use.

=== Typical receiver with TMA ===
It is a chain of 4 modules: antenna - short connecting cable (stage 1) - TMA (stage 2) - longer connecting cable (stage 3) - receiver (stage 4)

- Stage 1: By using the shortest, the least lossy connecting cable between the antenna and the TMA, $F_1$ is low$G_1$ is nearly one.
- Stage 2: The TMA of noise figure $F_2$ and gain $G_2$.
- Stage 3: Then comes the next cable ($F_3$ and $G_3$), but this time its noise addition ($F_3$) is reduced by $G_2$.
- Stage 4: Then comes the receiver, whose noise figure is less downgraded by the cables, as $G_1 \approx 1$, $G_2$ is from the TMA, $G_3$ and from the second cable. So $G_2$ will counteract the effects of $G_3$.

Updating the Friis formula with this case, the noise figure is now:

$System Noise Figure = F_1 + \frac{ F_2 - 1 }{ 1 } + \frac{ F_3 - 1 }{ 1 \times G_2 } + \frac{ F_4 - 1 }{ 1 \times G_2 \times G_3}$

In this way, the cable losses are now negligible and do not significantly affect the system noise figure.

This number is normally expressed in decibels (dB) thus:

$Noise Figure (in dB) = 10 \times \log_{10} (Fs)$

== See also ==
- Low-noise block converter
