= KA-SAT =

Communications satellite

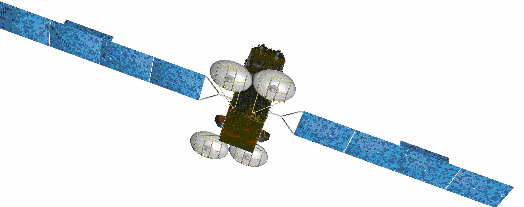
- Artist rendering of the KA-SAT satellite
- Mission type: Communication
- Operator: Viasat
- COSPAR ID: 2010-069A
- SATCAT no.: 37258

Spacecraft properties
- Bus: Eurostar E3000
- Manufacturer: EADS Astrium
- Launch mass: 6,150 kilograms (13,560 lb)

Start of mission
- Launch date: 26 December 2010
- Rocket: Proton-M/Briz-M
- Launch site: Baikonur 200/39
- Contractor: ILS

Orbital parameters
- Reference system: Geocentric
- Regime: Geostationary

KA-SAT is a high-throughput geostationary telecommunications satellite owned by Viasat. The satellite provides bidirectional broadband Internet access services across Europe and a small area of the Middle East, and additionally the Saorsat TV service to Ireland. It is positioned at 9°E, joining the Eurobird 9A K_{u} band satellite. KA-SAT was manufactured by EADS Astrium, based on the Eurostar E3000 platform, with a total weight of 6 tons. It was launched by Proton in December 2010. The satellite is named after the K_{a} band frequency, which is used on the spacecraft.

In November 2020, Viasat purchased Eutelsat's share of Euro Broadband Infrastructure (EBI) for $166 million (140 million euro), giving Viasat total ownership of the KA-SAT satellite and related ground infrastructure. The purchase was completed on April 30, 2021.

== Spacecraft ==
The spacecraft is equipped with four multi-feed deployable antennas with enhanced pointing accuracy and a high-efficiency repeater. It is configured with 82 spotbeams. Each spotbeam is associated with a 237 MHz wide transponder, allowing a data bit rate throughput of 475 Mbit/s per spot.

The spacecraft power is about 14 kW and the payload DC power is 11 kW. The solar array power provides up to 16 kW. The payload mass is about 1000 kg, the dry mass is about 3170 kg, the launch mass was 6100 kg. The manoeuvre lifetime in orbit is estimated to 16 years.

== Broadband Internet access service ==
KA-SAT features a high level of frequency reuse enabling the system to achieve a total capacity of more than 90 Gbit/s.

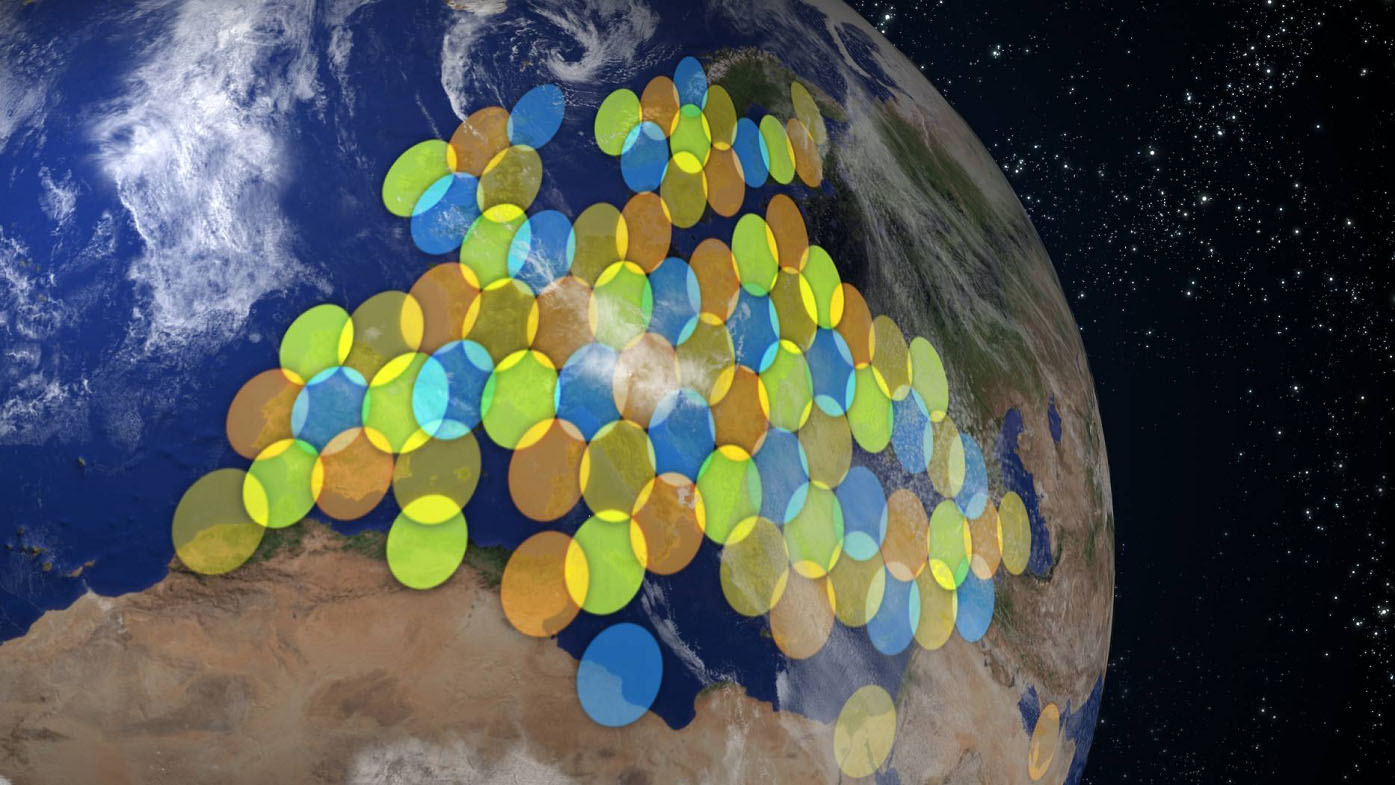
KA-SAT coverage over Europe and the Mediterranean Basin (different colors show frequency reuse)

The satellite operates in conjunction with ten terrestrial teleports (two of them as a backup) providing Internet gateway services, parts of the Eutelsat's Tooway service, all of them linked by the "KA-SAT ring", a terrestrial telecommunication high-speed network. The service is centrally operated from Skylogic's NOC based in Torino (Italy) (Skylogic is a subsidiary of Eutelsat).

=== Communication systems ===
The data communications used on the KA-SAT satellite are transmitted to and from equipment manufactured by ViaSat:

- in the Eutelsat's teleports (Internet gateways), the ViaSat "SurfBeam 2" hub system;
- at the customer site, the ViaSat "SurfBeam 2" modem as a customer-premises equipment.

"SurfBeam 2" is a modified version of the DOCSIS protocol adapted by ViaSat Inc. for the satellite physical link.

== Satellite television ==
KA-SAT carries the Irish Saorsat TV service accessed using a KA-Band feedhorn LNBF, for areas in Ireland where Irish Digital Terrestrial TV (Saorview) is inaccessible.

== Outages ==
Since 24 February 2022, about the start of the 2022 Russian invasion of Ukraine, the ViaSat Internet service has suffered disruptions over some parts of Europe.

According to Michel Friedling, Commander of the French Space Command, and Viasat itself, the disruptions were caused by a cyberattack.
