= Attenuation (disambiguation) =

Attenuation is the gradual loss in intensity of any kind of flux through a medium, including:

- Acoustic attenuation, the loss of sound energy in a viscous medium
- Anelastic attenuation factor, a way to describe attenuation of seismic energy in the Earth

Attenuation (or verb attenuate) may also refer to:

- Attenuation (botany)
- Attenuation (brewing), the percent of sugar converted to alcohol and carbon dioxide by the yeast in brewing
- Attenuation coefficient, a basic quantity used in calculations of the penetration of materials by quantum particles or other energy beams
- Mass attenuation coefficient, a measurement of how strongly a chemical species or substance absorbs or scatters light at a given wavelength, per unit mass
- Regression attenuation or Regression dilution, a cause of statistical bias
- The process of producing an attenuated vaccine by reducing the virulence of a pathogen
- Attenuation constant, the real part of the propagation constant
- Attenuator (genetics), form of regulation in prokaryotic cells.

== See also ==
- Attenuation distortion
- Attenuator (disambiguation)
