= Noise temperature =

Level of noise power introduced by a component or source

In electronics, noise temperature is one way of expressing the level of available noise power introduced by a component or source. The power spectral density of the noise is expressed in terms of the temperature (in kelvins) that would produce that level of Johnson–Nyquist noise, thus:

$$\frac{P_\text{N}}{B} = k_\text{B} T$$

where:

- $P_\text{N}$ is the noise power (in W, watts)
- $B$ is the total bandwidth (Hz, hertz) over which that noise power is measured
- $k_\text{B}$ is the Boltzmann constant (1.381×10^{−23} J/K, joules per kelvin)
- $T$ is the noise temperature (K, kelvin)

Thus the noise temperature is proportional to the power spectral density of the noise, $P_\text{N}/ B$. That is the power that would be absorbed from the component or source by a matched load. Noise temperature is generally a function of frequency, unlike that of an ideal resistor which is simply equal to the actual temperature of the resistor at all frequencies.

== Noise voltage and current ==
A noisy component may be modelled as a noiseless component in series with a noisy voltage source producing a voltage of v_{n}, or as a noiseless component in parallel with a noisy current source producing a current of i_{n}. This equivalent voltage or current corresponds to the above power spectral density $\frac{P} {B}$, and would have a mean squared amplitude over a bandwidth B of:

$$\begin{align}
\frac{\bar{v}_\text{n}^2}{B} &= 4 k_\text{B} R T \\
\\
\frac{\bar{i}_\text{n}^2}{B} &= 4 k_\text{B} G T
\end{align}$$

where R is the resistive part of the component's impedance or G is the conductance (real part) of the component's admittance. Speaking of noise temperature therefore offers a fair comparison between components having different impedances rather than specifying the noise voltage and qualifying that number by mentioning the component's resistance. It is also more accessible than speaking of the noise's power spectral density (in watts per hertz) since it is expressed as an ordinary temperature which can be compared to the noise level of an ideal resistor at room temperature (290 K).

Note that one can only speak of the noise temperature of a component or source whose impedance has a substantial (and measurable) resistive component. Thus it does not make sense to talk about the noise temperature of a capacitor or of a voltage source. The noise temperature of an amplifier refers to the noise that would be added at the amplifier's input (relative to the input impedance of the amplifier) in order to account for the added noise observed following amplification.

== System noise temperature ==
An RF receiver system is typically made up of an antenna and a receiver, and the transmission line(s) that connect the two together. Each of these is a source of additive noise. The additive noise in a receiving system can be of thermal origin (thermal noise) or can be from other external or internal noise-generating processes. The contributions of all noise sources are typically lumped together and regarded as a level of thermal noise. The noise power spectral density generated by any source ($P / B$) can be described by assigning to the noise a temperature $T$ as defined above:

$$T = \frac{P}{B} \cdot \frac{1}{k_\text{B}}$$

In an RF receiver, the overall system noise temperature $T_S$ equals the sum of the effective noise temperature of the receiver and transmission lines and that of the antenna.

$$T_{S} = T_{A} + T_{E}$$

The antenna noise temperature $T_{A}$ gives the noise power seen at the output of the antenna. The composite noise temperature of the receiver and transmission line losses $T_{E}$ represents the noise contribution of the rest of the receiver system. It is calculated as the effective noise that would be present at the antenna input terminals if the receiver system were perfect and created no noise. In other words, it is a cascaded system of amplifiers and losses where the internal noise temperatures are referred to the antenna input terminals. Thus, the summation of these two noise temperatures represents the noise input to a "perfect" receiver system.

== Noise factor and noise figure ==
One use of noise temperature is in the definition of a system's noise factor or noise figure. The noise factor specifies the increase in noise power (referred to the input of an amplifier) due to a component or system when its input noise temperature is $T_{0}$.

$$F = \frac{T_0 + T_\text{E}}{T_0}$$

$T_0$ is customarily taken to be room temperature, 290 K.

The noise factor (a linear term) is more often expressed as the noise figure (in decibels) using the conversion:

$$NF = 10 \log_{10} (F)$$

The noise figure can also be seen as the decrease in signal-to-noise ratio (SNR) caused by passing a signal through a system if the original signal had a noise temperature of 290 K. This is a common way of expressing the noise contributed by a radio frequency amplifier regardless of the amplifier's gain. For instance, assume an amplifier has a noise temperature 870 K and thus a noise figure of 6 dB. If that amplifier is used to amplify a source having a noise temperature of about room temperature (290 K), as many sources do, then the insertion of that amplifier would reduce the SNR of a signal by 6 dB. This simple relationship is frequently applicable where the source's noise is of thermal origin since a passive transducer will often have a noise temperature similar to 290 K.

However, in many cases the input source's noise temperature is much higher, such as an antenna at lower frequencies where atmospheric noise dominates. Then there will be little degradation of the SNR. On the other hand, a good satellite dish looking through the atmosphere into space (so that it sees a much lower noise temperature) would have the SNR of a signal degraded by more than 6 dB. In those cases a reference to the amplifier's noise temperature itself, rather than the noise figure defined according to room temperature, is more appropriate.

== Effective noise temperature ==
The noise temperature of an amplifier is commonly measured using the Y-factor method. If there are multiple amplifiers in cascade, the noise temperature of the cascade can be calculated using the Friis equation:

$$T_\text{E} = T_1 + \frac{T_2}{G_1} + \frac{T_3}{G_1 G_2} + \cdots$$

where

- $T_\text{E}$ = resulting noise temperature referred to the input
- $T_1$ = noise temperature of the first component in the cascade
- $T_2$ = noise temperature of the second component in the cascade
- $T_3$ = noise temperature of the third component in the cascade
- $G_1$ = power gain of the first component in the cascade
- $G_2$ = power gain of the second component in the cascade

Therefore, the amplifier chain can be modelled as a black box having a gain of $G_1 \cdot G_2 \cdot G_3 \cdots$ and a noise figure given by $NF = 10 \log_{10} (1 + T_\text{E}/290)$. In the usual case where the gains of the amplifier's stages are much greater than one, then it can be seen that the noise temperatures of the earlier stages have a much greater influence on the resulting noise temperature than those later in the chain. One can appreciate that the noise introduced by the first stage, for instance, is amplified by all of the stages whereas the noise introduced by later stages undergoes lesser amplification. Another way of looking at it is that the signal applied to a later stage already has a high noise level, due to amplification of noise by the previous stages, so that the noise contribution of that stage to that already amplified signal is of less significance.

This explains why the quality of a preamplifier or RF amplifier is of particular importance in an amplifier chain. In most cases only the noise figure of the first stage need be considered. However one must check that the noise figure of the second stage is not so high (or that the gain of the first stage is so low) that there is SNR degradation due to the second stage anyway. That will be a concern if the noise figure of the first stage plus that stage's gain (in decibels) is not much greater than the noise figure of the second stage.

One corollary of the Friis equation is that an attenuator prior to the first amplifier will degrade the noise figure due to the amplifier. For instance, if stage 1 represents a 6 dB attenuator so that $G_1 = \frac{1}{4}$, then $T_\text{E} = T_1 + 4 T_2 + \cdots$. Effectively the noise temperature of the amplifier $T_2$ has been quadrupled, in addition to the (smaller) contribution due to the attenuator itself $T_1$ (usually room temperature if the attenuator is composed of resistors). An antenna with poor efficiency is an example of this principle, where $G_1$ would represent the antenna's efficiency.

== See also ==
- Noise spectral density
