= Noise temperature (antenna) =

In radio frequency (RF) applications such as radio, radar and telecommunications, noise temperature of an antenna is a measure of the noise power density contributed by the antenna to the overall RF receiver system. It is defined as "the temperature of a resistor having an available thermal noise power per unit bandwidth equal to that at the antenna's output at a specified frequency". In other words, antenna noise temperature is a parameter that describes how much noise an antenna produces in a given environment. This temperature is not the physical temperature of the antenna. Moreover, an antenna does not have an intrinsic "antenna temperature" associated with it; rather the temperature depends on its gain pattern, pointing direction, and the thermal environment that it is placed in.

== Mathematics ==
In RF applications, noise power is defined using the relationship P_{noise} = kTB, where k is the Boltzmann constant, T is the noise temperature, and B is the noise bandwidth. Typically the noise bandwidth is determined by the bandwidth of the intermediate frequency (IF) filter of the radio receiver. Thus, we can define the noise temperature as:

$$T = \frac{P_\text{noise}}{kB}=\frac{1}{k}\frac{P_\text{noise}}{B}$$

Because k is a constant, we can effectively think of T as noise power spectral density (with unit W/Hz) normalized by k.

Antenna noise is only one of the contributors to the overall noise temperature of an RF receiver system, so it is typically subscripted, such as T_{A}. It is added directly to the effective noise temperature of the receiver to obtain the overall system noise temperature:

$$T_S=T_\text{A}+T_\text{E}$$

== Sources of antenna noise ==
Antenna noise temperature has contributions from many sources, including:

- Cosmic microwave background radiation
- Galactic radiation
- Earth heating
- The Sun
- The Moon
- Electrical devices
- The antenna itself

Galactic noise is high below 1000 MHz. At around 150 MHz, it is approximately 1000 K. At 2500 MHz, it has leveled off to around 10 K.

Earth has an accepted standard temperature of 288 K.

The level of the Sun's contribution depends on the solar flux. It is given by

$$T_\text{A}=3.468\,F{{\lambda}^2}10^{G/10}$$

where $F$ is the solar flux,

$\lambda$ is the wavelength,

and $G$ is the logarithmic gain of the antenna in decibels.

The antenna noise temperature depends on antenna coupling to all noise sources in its environment as well as on noise generated within the antenna. That is, in a directional antenna, the portion of the noise source that the antenna's main and side lobes intersect contribute proportionally.

For example, a satellite antenna may not receive noise contribution from the Earth in its main lobe, but sidelobes will contribute a portion of the 288 K Earth noise to its overall noise temperature.

== See also ==
- Noise Temperature
- Johnson–Nyquist noise
- Federal Standard 1037C
- MIL-STD-188
