= Member of the House of Assembly =

Member of the House of Assembly may refer to:

== Australia ==
- A member of the South Australian House of Assembly (MHA)
- A member of the Tasmanian House of Assembly

== Canada ==
- A member of the Newfoundland and Labrador House of Assembly

== United Kingdom ==
- A member of the House of Assembly (Anguilla)
- A member of the House of Assembly of the British Virgin Islands
- A member of the House of Assembly (Turks and Caicos Islands)

== See also ==
- Member of the National Assembly (Quebec) (MNA)
- Member of Provincial Parliament (Ontario) (MPP)
- Member of the Legislative Assembly (MLA), in all other provinces and territories of Canada
