= Voltage ladder =

A voltage ladder is a simple electronic circuit consisting of several resistors connected in series with a voltage placed across the entire resistor network, a generalisation of a two-resistor voltage divider. Connections to the nodes provide access to the voltages available. Voltage ladders are useful for providing a set of successive voltage references, for instance for a flash analog-to-digital converter.

== Operation ==
A voltage drop occurs across each resistor in the network causing each successive "rung" of the ladder (each node of the circuit) to have a higher voltage than the previous one.

Since the ladder is a series circuit, the current is the same throughout, and is given by the total voltage divided by the total series resistance (V/R_{eq}). The voltage drop across any one resistor is I×R_{n}, where I is the current calculated above, and R_{n} is the resistance of the resistor in question. The voltage referenced to ground at any node is simply the sum of the voltages dropped by each resistor between that node and ground.

Alternatively node voltages can be calculated using voltage division: the voltage drop across any resistor is V×R_{n}/R_{eq} where V is the total voltage, R_{eq} is the total (equivalent) resistance, and R_{n} is the resistance of the resistor in question. The voltage of a node referenced to ground is the sum of the drops across all the resistors, but it's now easier to consider all these resistors as a single equivalent resistance R_{T}, which is simply the sum of all the resistances between the node and ground, so the node voltage is given by V×R_{T}/R_{eq}.
