= Attenuator =

Attenuator could mean:

- Attenuator (electronics), an electronic device that reduces the amplitude of an electronic signal.
- Optical attenuator, an electronic device that reduces the amplitude of an optical signal.
- Attenuator (genetics), a specific regulatory sequence transcribed into RNA.
- Impact attenuator, used on highways as a crumple zone in case of a car crash.

== See also ==
- Attenuation (disambiguation)
