= Antenna gain-to-noise-temperature =

Measure of antenna performance

Antenna gain-to-noise-temperature (G/T) is a figure of merit in the characterization of antenna performance, where G is the antenna gain in decibels at the receive frequency, and T is the equivalent noise temperature of the receiving system in kelvins. The receiving system noise temperature is the summation of the antenna noise temperature and the RF chain noise temperature from the antenna terminals to the receiver output.

Antenna temperature (T_{ant}) is a parameter that describes how much noise an antenna produces in a given environment. Antenna noise temperature is not the physical temperature of the antenna but rather an expression of the available noise power at the antenna flange. Moreover, an antenna does not have an intrinsic "antenna temperature" associated with it; rather the temperature depends on its gain pattern and the thermal environment that it is placed in. Antenna temperature is also sometimes referred to as Antenna Noise Temperature. To define the environment, we'll introduce a temperature distribution – this is the temperature in every direction away from the antenna in spherical coordinates. For instance, the night sky is roughly 4 K; the value of the temperature pattern in the direction of the Earth's ground is the physical temperature of the Earth's ground. This temperature distribution will be written as T_{S}(θ, φ). Hence, an antenna's temperature will vary depending on whether it is directional and pointed into space or staring into the sun.

For an antenna with a radiation pattern given by G(θ, φ), the noise temperature is mathematically defined as:

$T_\text{A} = \frac{1}{4\pi} \int_{0}^{2\pi} \int_{0}^{\pi} G(\theta,\varphi) T_\text{S}(\theta,\varphi) \sin(\theta) \ d\theta \ d\varphi$

This states that the temperature surrounding the antenna is integrated over the entire sphere, and weighted by the antenna's radiation pattern. Hence, an isotropic antenna would have a noise temperature that is the average of all temperatures around the antenna; for a perfectly directional antenna (with a pencil beam), the antenna temperature will only depend on the temperature in which the antenna is "looking".

The noise power P_{N} received from an antenna at temperature T_{A} can be expressed in terms of the bandwidth, B, that the antenna (and its receiver) are operating over:

$P_\text{N} = k T_\text{A} B$,

where k is the Boltzmann constant. The receiver also has a temperature associated with it, T_{E}, and the total system temperature T (antenna plus receiver) has a combined temperature given by T = T_{A} + T_{E}. This temperature can be used in the above equation to find the total noise power of the system. These concepts begin to illustrate how antenna engineers must understand receivers and the associated electronics, because the resulting systems very much depend on each other.

A parameter often encountered in specification sheets for antennas that operate in certain environments is the ratio of gain of the antenna divided by the antenna temperature (or system temperature if a receiver is specified). This parameter is written as G/T, and has the unit dB·K^{−1}.

G/T calculation

G/T is the figure of merit for a satellite system

G is the Receive antenna gain.
T is the system noise temperature.

System noise temperature = antenna noise temperature + receiver noise temperature (LNA)

Antenna noise temperature is the noise power seen at the receiving output of the antenna (to LNA)

If we are not measuring with an LNA or receiver then:

System noise temperature = antenna noise temperature.
This is not a representative value for calculating G/T since the G/T relates to the receive performance of both antenna and receiver.

== Selection of antenna aperture ==
Satellite antenna aperture is closely related to the quality factor (G/T value) of the earth station. The G/T value and satellite power demand, i.e. equivalent rent bandwidth, is a logarithmic linear relationship. So the value of equivalent rent bandwidth increases with the narrowing of antenna aperture.

Therefore, when selecting the earth station aperture, it is not a case of the smaller, the better. The earth station aperture should make a compromise between the space overhead (equivalent rent bandwidth) and ground overhead (antenna aperture) in order to make the system achieve optimum allocation.

Achievable G/T with current VSAT antenna in C & Ku Bands (elevation angle E = 35°)

Diameter G/T

3.8 m 21.7
7.5 m 25.3
11 m 31.7
