= Y-factor =

Method for determining noise temperature

The Y-factor method is a widely used technique for measuring the gain and noise temperature of an amplifier. It is based on the Johnson–Nyquist noise of a resistor at two different, known temperatures.

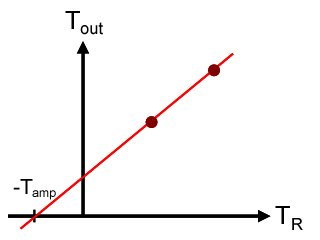
Plot used in the Y-factor method for determining the gain and noise temperature of an amplifier

Consider a microwave amplifier with a 50-ohm impedance with a 50-ohm resistor connected to the amplifier input. If the resistor is at a physical temperature T_{R}, then the Johnson–Nyquist noise power coupled to the amplifier input is P_{J} = k_{B}T_{R}B, where k_{B} is the Boltzmann constant, and B is the bandwidth. The noise power at the output of the amplifier (i.e. the noise power coupled to an impedance-matched load that is connected to the amplifier output) is P_{out} = Gk_{B}(T_{R} + T_{amp})B, where G is the amplifier power gain, and T_{amp} is the amplifier noise temperature. In the Y-factor technique, P_{out} is measured for two different, known values of T_{R}. P_{out} is then converted to an effective temperature T_{out} (in units of kelvin) by dividing by k_{B} and the measurement bandwidth B. The two values of T_{out} are then plotted as a function of T_{R} (also in units of kelvin), and a line is fit to these points (see figure). The slope of this line is equal to the amplifier power gain. The x intercept of the line is equal to the negative of the amplifier noise temperature −T_{amp} in kelvins. The amplifier noise temperature can also be determined from the y intercept, which is equal to T_{amp} multiplied by the gain.
