= Richard Duffin =

American physicist (1909-1996)

- Born: 1909; Chicago, Illinois, U.S.
- Died: October 29, 1996 (aged 87); Pittsburgh, Pennsylvania, U.S.
- Education: University of Illinois at Urbana-Champaign
- Known for: Work on electrical network theory DKP algebra Duffin–Schaeffer conjecture Bott–Duffin synthesis
- Awards: John von Neumann Theory Prize (1982)
- Scientific career
- Fields: Physics
- Workplaces: Carnegie Mellon University; Purdue University
- Doctoral advisor: Harold Mott-Smith; David Bourgin
- Doctoral students: Raoul Bott; Hans Weinberger

Richard James Duffin (1909 – October 29, 1996) was an American physicist, known for his contributions to electrical transmission theory and to the development of geometric programming and other areas within operations research.

== Education and career ==
Duffin obtained a BSc in physics at the University of Illinois, where he was elected to Sigma Xi in 1932. He stayed at Illinois for his PhD, which was advised by Harold Mott-Smith and David Bourgin, producing a thesis entitled Galvanomagnetic and Thermomagnetic Phenomena (1935).

Duffin lectured at Purdue University and Illinois before joining the Carnegie Institute in Washington, D.C. during World War II. His wartime work was devoted to the development of navigational equipment and mine detectors. In 1946, he became professor of mathematics at Carnegie Mellon University. He wrote a letter of recommendation to Princeton University for John Forbes Nash, Jr., later a Nobel laureate. In 1949, Duffin and his student Raoul Bott developed a generalized method of synthesising networks without transformers which were required in earlier methods.

In 1941, Duffin and A. C. Schaeffer put forward a conjecture in metric diophantine approximation which was resolved in 2020 by James Maynard and Dimitris Koukoulopoulos.

In 1967 Duffin joined with Clarence Zener and Elmor Peterson to write Geometric Programming which developed a branch of mathematical programming by introducing a generalization of polynomials to posynomials for engineering applications. Impressed with its innovations, a reviewer wrote, "common sense, ingenuity and originality in applying first principles are still competitive with other creative forms of the intellect." The methods of geometric programming are sometimes adapted for convex optimization.

Duffin would remain at Carnegie Mellon until his retirement in 1988. Duffin was also a consultant to Westinghouse Electric Corporation.

Duffin was inducted to the National Academy of Sciences in 1972 and to the American Academy of Arts and Sciences in 1974. He was joint winner of the 1982 John von Neumann Theory Prize, and winner of Sigma Xi's Monie A. Ferst Award for 1984 in recognition of his ability as a teacher and communicator. He was elected to the 2002 class of Fellows of the Institute for Operations Research and the Management Sciences.

== Selected publications ==
- 1949: (with Raoul Bott) "Impedance synthesis without the use of transformers", Journal of Applied Physics 20:816.
- 1952: (with A. C. Schaeffer) Duffin, R. J.; Schaeffer, A. C. (1952). "A class of nonharmonic Fourier series". Trans. Amer. Math. Soc. 72 (2): 341–366. doi:10.1090/s0002-9947-1952-0047179-6. MR 0047179.
- 1953: (with R. Bott) Bott, R.; Duffin, R. J. (1953). "On the algebra of networks". Transactions of the American Mathematical Society. 74: 99–109. doi:10.1090/s0002-9947-1953-0056573-x. MR 0056573.
- 1956: Duffin, R. J. (1956). "Exponential decays in nonlinear networks". Proc. Amer. Math. Soc. 7 (6): 1094–1106. doi:10.1090/s0002-9939-1956-0083366-8. MR 0083366.
- 1959: Duffin, R. J. (1959). "An analysis of the Wang algebra of networks". Trans. Amer. Math. Soc. 93: 114–131. doi:10.1090/s0002-9947-1959-0109161-6. MR 0109161.
- 1962: Duffin, R. J. (1962). "The reciprocal of a Fourier series". Proceedings of the American Mathematical Society. 13 (6): 965–970. doi:10.1090/s0002-9939-1962-0145259-x. MR 0145259.
- 1967: (with Elmor Peterson and Clarence M. Zener) Geometric Programming, John Wiley & Sons
- 1974: Duffin, R. J. (1974). "Some problems of mathematics and science". Bulletin of the American Mathematical Society. 80 (6): 1053–1070. doi:10.1090/s0002-9904-1974-13618-9. MR 0359436.

== See also ==
- Frame (linear algebra)
- Parallel addition
- Signomial
- Wang algebra
