= Zener =

Zener can refer to:

- Zener diode, a type of electronic diode
- Zener effect, a type of electrical breakdown which is employed in a Zener diode
- Zener pinning, the influence of a dispersion of fine particles on the movement of low- and high angle grain boundaries through a polycrystalline material
- Clarence Zener, the American physicist after whom the diode, effect, and pinning are named
- Karl Zener, the American psychologist after whom the cards are named
  - Zener cards, cards used to conduct experiments for extra-sensory perception
