= Orthonormal frame =

Concept in Riemannian geometry

In Riemannian geometry and relativity theory, an orthonormal frame is a tool for studying the structure of a differentiable manifold equipped with a metric. If M is a manifold equipped with a metric g, then an orthonormal frame at a point P of M is an ordered basis of the tangent space at P consisting of vectors which are orthonormal with respect to the bilinear form g_{P}.

== See also ==
- Frame (linear algebra)
- Frame bundle
- k-frame
- Moving frame
- Frame fields in general relativity
