= Fusion frame =

Mathematical frame extension

In mathematics, a fusion frame of a vector space is a natural extension of a frame. It is an additive construct of several, potentially "overlapping" frames. The motivation for this concept comes from the event that a signal can not be acquired by a single sensor alone (a constraint found by limitations of hardware or data throughput), rather the partial components of the signal must be collected via a network of sensors, and the partial signal representations are then fused into the complete signal.

By construction, fusion frames easily lend themselves to parallel or distributed processing of sensor networks consisting of arbitrary overlapping sensor fields.

== Definition ==
Given a Hilbert space $\mathcal{H}$, let $\{W_i\}_{i \in \mathcal{I}}$ be closed subspaces of $\mathcal{H}$, where $\mathcal{I}$ is an index set. Let $\{ v_i \}_{i \in \mathcal{I}}$ be a set of positive scalar weights. Then $\{ W_i, v_i \}_{i \in \mathcal{I}}$ is a fusion frame of $\mathcal{H}$ if there exist constants $0 < A \leq B<\infty$ such that

$$A\|f\|^2\leq\sum_{i\in\mathcal{I}}v_i^2\big\|P_{W_i}f\big\|^2\leq B\|f\|^2, \quad \forall f\in\mathcal{H},$$

where $P_{W_i}$ denotes the orthogonal projection onto the subspace $W_i$. The constants $A$ and $B$ are called lower and upper bound, respectively. When the lower and upper bounds are equal to each other, $\{ W_i, v_i \}_{i \in \mathcal{I}}$ becomes a $A$-tight fusion frame. Furthermore, if $A=B=1$, we can call $\{ W_i, v_i \}_{i \in \mathcal{I}}$ Parseval fusion frame.

Assume $\{f_{ij}\}_{i \in \mathcal{I}, j\in J_i}$ is a frame for $W_i$. Then $\{ \left(W_i, v_i, \{f_{ij}\}_{j\in J_i} \right)\}_{i \in \mathcal{I}}$ is called a fusion frame system for $\mathcal{H}$.

=== Relation to global frames ===
Let $\{W_i\}_{i\in\mathcal{H}}$ be closed subspaces of $\mathcal{H}$ with positive weights $\{ v_i \}_{i \in \mathcal{I}}$. Suppose $\{f_{ij}\}_{i \in \mathcal{I}, j\in J_i}$ is a frame for $W_i$ with frame bounds $C_i$ and $D_i$. Let $C= \inf_{i\in\mathcal{I}}C_i$ and $D=\inf_{i\in\mathcal{I}}D_i$, which satisfy that $0<C\leq D<\infty$. Then $\{ W_i, v_i \}_{i \in \mathcal{I}}$ is a fusion frame of $\mathcal{H}$ if and only if $\{v_if_{ij}\}_{i \in \mathcal{I}, j\in J_i}$ is a frame of $\mathcal{H}$.

Additionally, if $\{ \left(W_i, v_i, \{f_{ij}\}_{j\in J_i} \right)\}_{i \in \mathcal{I}}$ is a fusion frame system for $\mathcal{H}$ with lower and upper bounds $A$ and $B$, then $\{v_if_{ij}\}_{i \in \mathcal{I}, j\in J_i}$ is a frame of $\mathcal{H}$ with lower and upper bounds $AC$ and $BD$. And if $\{v_if_{ij}\}_{i \in \mathcal{I}, j\in J_i}$ is a frame of $\mathcal{H}$ with lower and upper bounds $E$ and $F$, then $\{ \left(W_i, v_i, \{f_{ij}\}_{j\in J_i} \right)\}_{i \in \mathcal{I}}$ is a fusion frame system for $\mathcal{H}$ with lower and upper bounds $E/D$ and $F/C$.

=== Local frame representation ===
Let $W\subset\mathcal{H}$ be a closed subspace, and let $\{x_n\}$ be an orthonormal basis of $W$. Then the orthogonal projection of $f \in \mathcal{H}$ onto $W$ is given by

$$P_Wf = \sum\langle f,x_n\rangle x_n.$$

We can also express the orthogonal projection of $f$ onto $W$ in terms of given local frame $\{f_k\}$ of $W$

$$P_Wf = \sum\langle f,f_k\rangle \tilde{f}_k,$$

where $\{\tilde{f}_k\}$ is a dual frame of the local frame $\{f_k\}$.

== Fusion frame operator ==
=== Definition ===
Let $\{ W_i, v_i \}_{i \in \mathcal{I}}$ be a fusion frame for $\mathcal{H}$. Let $\{\sum\bigoplus W_i\}_{l_2}$ be representation space for projection. The analysis operator $T_W: \mathcal{H}\rightarrow\{\sum\bigoplus W_i\}_{l_2}$ is defined by

$$T_W\left(f \right)=\{v_iP_{W_i}\left(f \right)\}_{i\in\mathcal{I}}.$$

The adjoint is called the synthesis operator $T^{\ast}_W: \{\sum\bigoplus W_i\}_{l_2}\rightarrow \mathcal{H}$, defined as

$$T^{\ast}_W\left(g \right)=\sum v_if_i,$$

where $g=\{f_i\}_{i\in\mathcal{I}}\in\{\sum\bigoplus W_i\}_{l_2}$.

The fusion frame operator $S_W: \mathcal{H}\rightarrow\mathcal{H}$ is defined by

$$S_W\left(f \right)=T^{\ast}_WT_W\left(f \right)=\sum v^{2}_iP_{W_i}\left(f \right).$$

=== Properties ===
Given the lower and upper bounds of the fusion frame $\{ W_i, v_i \}_{i \in \mathcal{I}}$, $A$ and $B$, the fusion frame operator $S_W$ can be bounded by

$$AI\leq S_W\leq BI,$$

where $I$ is the identity operator. Therefore, the fusion frame operator $S_W$ is positive and invertible.

=== Representation ===
Given a fusion frame system $\{ \left(W_i, v_i, \mathcal{F}_i\right)\}_{i \in \mathcal{I}}$ for $\mathcal{H}$, where $\mathcal{F}_i=\{f_{ij}\}_{j\in J_i}$, and $\tilde{\mathcal{F}}_i=\{\tilde{f}_{ij}\}_{j\in J_i}$, which is a dual frame for $\mathcal{F}_i$, the fusion frame operator $S_W$ can be expressed as

$$S_W=\sum v^2_iT^{\ast}_{\tilde{\mathcal{F}}_i}T_{\mathcal{F}_i}=\sum v^2_iT^{\ast}_{\mathcal{F}_i}T_{\tilde{\mathcal{F}}_i}$$,

where $T_{\mathcal{F}_i}$, $T_{\tilde{\mathcal{F}}_i}$ are analysis operators for $\mathcal{F}_i$ and $\tilde{\mathcal{F}}_i$ respectively, and $T^{\ast}_{\mathcal{F}_i}$, $T^{\ast}_{\tilde{\mathcal{F}}_i}$ are synthesis operators for $\mathcal{F}_i$ and $\tilde{\mathcal{F}}_i$ respectively.

For finite frames (i.e., $\dim\mathcal H =: N < \infty$ and $|\mathcal I|<\infty$), the fusion frame operator can be constructed with a matrix. Let $\{ W_i, v_i \}_{i \in \mathcal{I}}$ be a fusion frame for $\mathcal{H}_N$, and let $\{ f_{ij} \}_{j \in \mathcal{J}_i}$ be a frame for the subspace $W_i$ and $J_i$ an index set for each $i\in\mathcal{I}$. Then the fusion frame operator $S: \mathcal{H}\to\mathcal{H}$ reduces to an $N\times N$ matrix, given by

$$S = \sum_{i\in\mathcal{I}}v_i^2 F_i \tilde{F}_i^T,$$

with

$$F_i = \begin{bmatrix} \vdots & \vdots & & \vdots \\ f_{i1} & f_{i2} & \cdots & f_{i|J_i|} \\ \vdots & \vdots & & \vdots \\\end{bmatrix}_{N \times |J_i|},$$

and

$$\tilde{F}_i = \begin{bmatrix} \vdots & \vdots & & \vdots \\ \tilde{f}_{i1} & \tilde{f}_{i2} & \cdots & \tilde{f}_{i|J_i|} \\ \vdots & \vdots & & \vdots \\\end{bmatrix}_{N \times |J_i|},$$

where $\tilde{f}_{ij}$ is the canonical dual frame of $f_{ij}$.

== See also ==
- Hilbert space
- Frame (linear algebra)
