= Voltage-regulator tube =

Gas-filled tube for voltage regulation employing either glow or corona discharge

Schematic representation of a cold cathode voltage-regulator tube

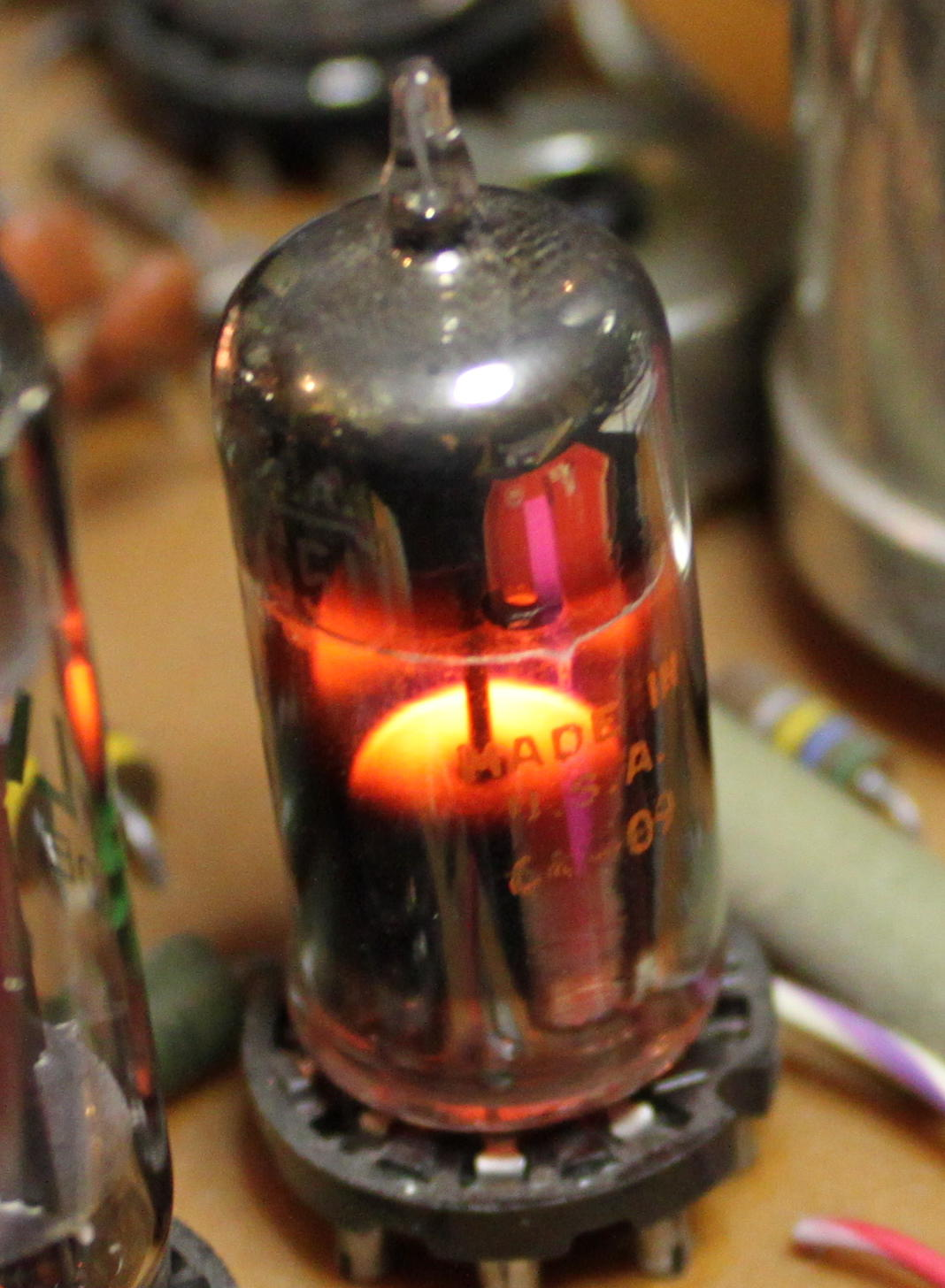
5651 Regulator tube in operation

A voltage-regulator tube (VR tube) is an electronic component used as a shunt regulator to hold a voltage constant at a predetermined level.

Physically, these devices resemble vacuum tubes, but there are two main differences:

- Their glass envelopes are filled with a gas mixture, and
- They have a cold cathode; the cathode is not heated with a filament to emit electrons.

Electrically, these devices resemble Zener diodes, with the following major differences:

- They rely on gas ionization, rather than Zener breakdown
- The unregulated supply voltage must be 15–20% above the nominal output voltage to ensure that the discharge starts
- The output can be higher than nominal if the current through the tube is too low.

When sufficient voltage is applied across the electrodes, the gas ionizes, forming a glow discharge around the cathode electrode. The VR tube then acts as a negative resistance device; as the current through the device increases, the amount of ionization also increases, reducing the resistance of the device to further current flow. In this way, the device conducts sufficient current to hold the voltage across its terminals to the desired value.

Because the device would conduct a nearly unlimited amount of current, there must be some external means of limiting the current. Usually, this is provided by an external resistor upstream from the VR tube. The VR tube then conducts any portion of the current that does not flow into the downstream load, maintaining an approximately constant voltage across the VR tube's electrodes. The VR tube's regulation voltage was only guaranteed when conducting an amount of current within the allowable range. In particular, if the current through the tube is too low to maintain ionization, the output voltage can rise above the nominal output—as far as the input supply voltage. If the current through the tube is too high, it can enter an arc discharge mode where the voltage will be significantly lower than nominal and the tube may be damaged.

Some voltage-regulator tubes contained small amounts of radionuclides to produce a more reliable ionization.

The Corona VR tube is a high-voltage version that is filled with hydrogen at close to atmospheric pressure, and is designed for voltages ranging from 400 V to 30 kV at tens of microamperes. It has a coaxial form; the outer cylindrical electrode is the cathode and the inner one is the anode. The voltage stability depends on the gas pressure.

A successful hydrogen voltage regulator tube, from 1925, was the Raytheon tube, which allowed radios of the time to be operated from AC power instead of batteries.

== Specific models ==
In America, VR tubes were given RETMA tube part numbers. Lacking a heater (filament), the tube's part numbers began with "0" (zero).

In Europe, VR tubes were given part numbers under the professional system ("ZZ1xxx") and under a dedicated system.

In USSR, glow-discharge stabilitrons were given designation in Cyrillic with serial number of development. For example, "СГ21Б", "СГ204К" and i.e.

VR tubes were only available in certain voltages. Common models were:

Octal-based tubes, 5–40 mA current:

- 0A3 – 75 volts
- 0B3 – 90 volts
- 0C3 – 105 volts (best regulation of these four)
- 0D3 – 150 volts

Miniature tubes, 5–30 mA current:

- 0A2 – 150 volts
- 0B2 – 108 volts (best regulation of these three)
- 0C2 – 72 volts

Miniature tubes, 1–10 mA current:

- 85A2 – 85 volts (equivalents: 0G3, CV449, CV4048, QS83/3, QS1209)

Voltage reference 1.5–3.0 mA current:

- 5651 – 87 volts (the most popular voltage reference ever made)

- 5651A – 85.5 volts

Subminiature tubes:

- Various models such as the 991 that resembled neon lamps, but were optimized for more-accurate voltage regulation

Miniature corona tubes, 5–55 μA current:

- CK1022 1 kV

Wire-ended subminiature corona tubes:

- CK1037 (6437) 700 volts, 5–125 μA
- CK1038 900 volts, 5–55 μA
- CK1039 (6438) 1.2 kV, 5–125 μA

== Design considerations ==
Some voltage regulator tubes have an internal jumper connected between two of the pins. This jumper could be used in series with the secondary transformer winding. Then, if the tube was removed, rather than leaving the voltage unregulated, the output would turn off.

Because the glow discharge is a "statistical" process, a certain amount of electrical noise is introduced into the regulated voltage as the level of ionization varies. In most cases, this can be easily filtered out by placing a small capacitor in parallel with the VR tube or using an RC decoupling network downstream of the VR tube. Too large a capacitance (>0.1 μF for an 0D3, for instance), however, and the circuit will form a relaxation oscillator, definitely ruining the voltage regulation and possibly causing the tube to fail catastrophically.

VR tubes can be operated in series for greater voltage ranges. They cannot be operated in parallel: because of manufacturing variations, the current would not be shared equally among several tubes in parallel. (Zener diodes show similar behavior when connected in series and parallel.)

In the present day, VR tubes have been almost-entirely supplanted by solid-state regulators based on Zener diodes and avalanche breakdown diodes.

== VR tube information ==
Correctly operating VR tubes glow during normal operation. The color of the glow varies depending upon the gas mixture used to fill the tubes.

Though they lack a heater, VR tubes often do become warm during operation due to the current and voltage drop through them.
