= Duffin–Kemmer–Petiau algebra =

Algebra generated by the Duffin-Kemmer-Petiau matrices

In mathematical physics, the Duffin–Kemmer–Petiau (DKP) algebra, introduced by R.J. Duffin, Nicholas Kemmer and G. Petiau, is the algebra which is generated by the Duffin–Kemmer–Petiau matrices. These matrices form part of the Duffin–Kemmer–Petiau equation that provides a relativistic description of spin-0 and spin-1 particles.

The DKP algebra is also referred to as the meson algebra.

== Defining relations ==
The Duffin–Kemmer–Petiau matrices have the defining relation

$$\beta^{a} \beta^{b} \beta^{c} + \beta^{c} \beta^{b} \beta^{a} =  \beta^{a} \eta^{b c} + \beta^{c} \eta^{b a}$$

where $\eta^{a b}$ stand for a constant diagonal matrix. The Duffin–Kemmer–Petiau matrices $\beta$ for which $\eta^{a b}$ consists in diagonal elements (+1,-1,...,-1) form part of the Duffin–Kemmer–Petiau equation. Five-dimensional DKP matrices can be represented as:

$$\beta^{0} =
\begin{pmatrix}
0&1&0&0&0\\
1&0&0&0&0\\
0&0&0&0&0\\
0&0&0&0&0\\
0&0&0&0&0
\end{pmatrix}$$,
$$\quad
\beta^{1} =
\begin{pmatrix}
0&0&-1&0&0\\
0&0&0&0&0\\
1&0&0&0&0\\
0&0&0&0&0\\
0&0&0&0&0
\end{pmatrix}$$,
$$\quad
\beta^{2} =
\begin{pmatrix}
0&0&0&-1&0\\
0&0&0&0&0\\
0&0&0&0&0\\
1&0&0&0&0\\
0&0&0&0&0
\end{pmatrix}$$,
$$\quad
\beta^{3} =
\begin{pmatrix}
0&0&0&0&-1\\
0&0&0&0&0\\
0&0&0&0&0\\
0&0&0&0&0\\
1&0&0&0&0
\end{pmatrix}$$

These five-dimensional DKP matrices represent spin-0 particles. The DKP matrices for spin-1 particles are 10-dimensional. The DKP-algebra can be reduced to a direct sum of irreducible subalgebras for spin‐0 and spin‐1 bosons, the subalgebras being defined by multiplication rules for the linearly independent basis elements.

== Duffin–Kemmer–Petiau equation ==
The Duffin–Kemmer–Petiau (DKP) equation, also known as Kemmer equation, is a relativistic wave equation which describes spin-0 and spin-1 particles in the description of the Standard Model. For particles with nonzero mass, the DKP equation is

$$(i \hbar \beta^{a} \partial_a - m c) \psi = 0$$

where $\beta^{a}$ are Duffin–Kemmer–Petiau matrices, $m$ is the particle's mass, $\psi$ its wavefunction, $\hbar$ the reduced Planck constant, $c$ the speed of light. For massless particles, the term $m c$ is replaced by a singular matrix $\gamma$ that obeys the relations $\beta^{a} \gamma + \gamma \beta^{a} = \beta^{a}$ and $\gamma^2 = \gamma$.

The DKP equation for spin-0 is closely linked to the Klein–Gordon equation and the equation for spin-1 to the Proca equations. It suffers the same drawback as the Klein–Gordon equation in that it calls for negative probabilities. Also the De Donder–Weyl covariant Hamiltonian field equations can be formulated in terms of DKP matrices.

== History ==
The Duffin–Kemmer–Petiau algebra was introduced in the 1930s by R.J. Duffin, N. Kemmer and G. Petiau.
