= Nicholas Kemmer =

British physicist (1911–1998)

- Born: 7 December 1911; Saint Petersburg, Russia
- Died: 21 October 1998 (aged 86); Edinburgh, Scotland
- Citizenship: Russia; Germany; United Kingdom
- Education: University of Göttingen; University of Zurich; Imperial College London
- Known for: British nuclear programme Neutron scattering Duffin–Kemmer–Petiau algebra
- Awards: Gunning Victoria Jubilee Prize (1984); Max Planck Medal (1983); J. Robert Oppenheimer Memorial Prize (1975); Hughes Medal (1966); FRS (1956)
- Scientific career
- Fields: Nuclear physics
- Workplaces: Tube Alloys; Manhattan Project; Trinity College, Cambridge; Berkeley Radiation Laboratory; University of Edinburgh
- Doctoral advisor: Wolfgang Pauli; Gregor Wentzel
- Doctoral students: Abdus Salam; Paul Taunton Matthews; Richard Dalitz; John Stephen Roy Chisholm; Lalit Mohan Nath

Nicholas Kemmer FRS FRSE (7 December 1911 – 21 October 1998) was a Russian-born nuclear physicist working in Britain, who played an integral and leading edge role in the United Kingdom's nuclear programme, and was known as a mentor of Abdus Salam – a Nobel laureate in physics.

== Life ==
=== Early life ===
Nicholas was born to Nicholas P. Kemmer and Barbara Stutzer in Saint Petersburg. His family moved to Germany in 1922, where he was educated at Bismarckschule Hanover and then at the University of Göttingen. He received his doctorate in nuclear physics at the University of Zurich and worked as an assistant to Wolfgang Pauli, who had to give strong arguments in 1936, before being allowed to employ a non-Swiss national. Later on, Kemmer moved to the Beit Fellowship at Imperial College London.

=== British nuclear development ===
Kemmer moved to Trinity College, Cambridge in 1940 to work on Tube Alloys, the wartime atomic energy project. In 1940, when Egon Bretscher and Norman Feather showed that a slow neutron reactor fuelled with uranium would in theory produce substantial amounts of plutonium-239 as a by-product, Kemmer (who was lodging at the Bretschers') proposed the names Neptunium for the new element 93 and Plutonium for 94 by analogy with the outer planets Neptune and Pluto beyond Uranus (uranium being element 92). The Americans Edwin M. McMillan and Philip Abelson at the Berkeley Radiation Laboratory, who had made the same discovery, fortuitously suggested the same names.

=== Professorship ===
Kemmer spent 1944–1946 in Canada. In 1953 he became the third Tait Professor of Mathematical Physics at the University of Edinburgh, succeeding the retiring Max Born. He founded the Tait Institute of Mathematical Physics in 1955 and taught at Edinburgh until 1979. He was elected as a Fellow of the Royal Society of Edinburgh in 1954. His proposers were Norman Feather, Max Born, Sir Edmund Whittaker and Alexander Aitken. He served as the Society's Vice-President from 1971 to 1974.

Kemmer was elected a Fellow of the Royal Society in 1956 and won its Hughes Medal in 1966. He was awarded the J. Robert Oppenheimer Memorial Prize in 1975. Nicholas Kemmer was also a mentor and a teacher of the only Pakistani Nobel laureate, Dr. Abdus Salam. Kemmer is credited to trained and work with Salam in Neutron scattering by using relativity equations.

== Work and legacy ==
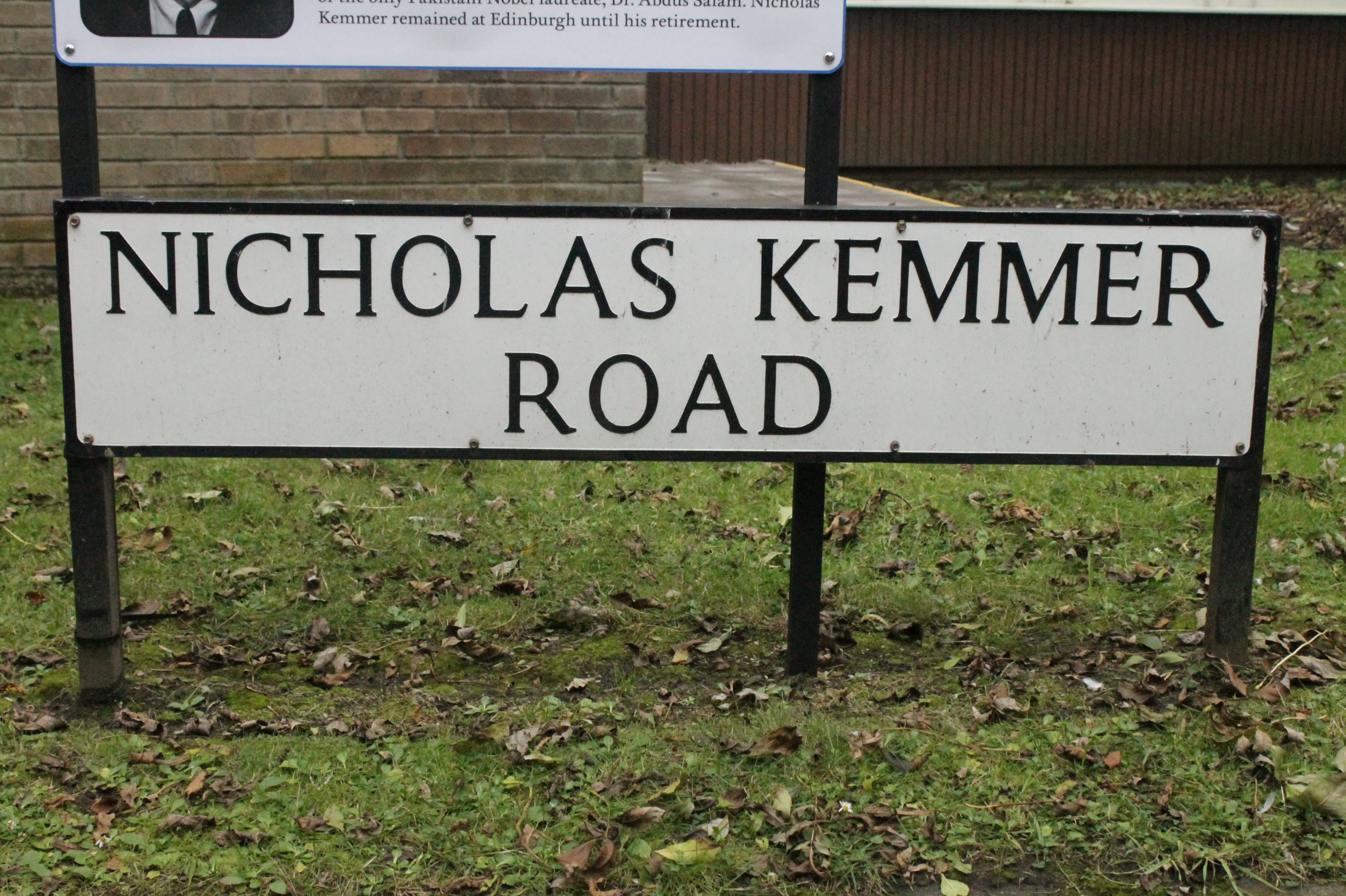
Nicholas Kemmer Road, King's Buildings, Edinburgh

=== Duffin–Kemmer–Petiau equation ===
The Duffin–Kemmer–Petiau equation (DKP equation, also called Duffin–Kemmer equation or Kemmer equation) plays a role in the description of the Standard Model of particles, together with the Yang-Mills field. The Duffin–Kemmer–Petiau equation is closely linked to the Proca equation and the Klein–Gordon equation. The DKP equation suffers the same drawback as the Klein–Gordon equation in that it calls for negative probabilities. The equation involves matrices which obey the Duffin–Kemmer–Petiau algebra. The work leading to the DKP equation, culminating in Kemmer's article, has been quoted as "the first attempt at writing down a satisfactory relativistic theory of elementary particles beyond the electron", and these equations have later been brought in unified form with the Dirac equation by Homi J. Bhabha.

== Recognition ==
Nicholas Kemmer Road in Edinburgh University's King's Buildings complex is named in his honour.
