= Albert Charles Schaeffer =

American mathematician (1907–1957)

Albert Charles Schaeffer (13 August 1907, Belvidere, Illinois – 2 February 1957) was an American mathematician who worked on complex analysis.

== Biography ==
Schaeffer was the son of Albert John and Mary Plane Schaeffer (née Herrick). He studied civil engineering at the University of Wisconsin, Madison (bachelor's degree 1930) and was, from 1930 to 1933, employed as a highway engineer. In 1936, he received a PhD in mathematics under Eberhard Hopf at MIT. From 1936 to 1939, he was an instructor at Purdue University. In 1939, he became an instructor at Stanford University where he became, in 1941, assistant professor, in 1943 associate professor and in 1946 professor. From 1947 to 1950, he was a professor at Purdue University. From 1950 to 1957, he was a professor at the University of Wisconsin, Madison, and in the academic year 1956/57, the chair of the mathematics department.

Schaeffer worked with Donald Spencer at Stanford University on variational problems of conformal mapping, for example, coefficient ranges for schlicht functions (functions analytic and one-to-one). Specifically, they worked on special cases of the Bieberbach conjecture, for which they gave a proof that the third coefficient satisfied the conjectured estimate (a result already proved by Charles Loewner). Their goal was to give a proof for the fourth coefficient, but their approach would have required the numerical integration of about one million differential equations. A little later, Paul Garabedian and Max Schiffer, then at Stanford, improved the Schaeffer–Spencer method and greatly reduced the number of necessary integrations. With this improvement, Garabedian and Schiffer were able in 1955 to prove the conjectured estimate for the fourth coefficient. In 1948, Schaeffer shared the Bôcher Memorial Prize with Spencer for their joint work on schlicht functions.

In 1941, Schaeffer and R. J. Duffin put forward a conjecture in metric diophantine approximation which was resolved in 2020 by James Maynard and Dimitris Koukoulopoulos.

In 1931, he married Caroline Juliette Marsh. They had two sons and a daughter.

== Selected publications ==
- Schaeffer, A. C. (1937). "Existence theorem for the flow of an ideal incompressible fluid in two dimensions". Trans. Amer. Math. Soc. 42 (3): 497–513. doi:10.1090/s0002-9947-1937-1501931-8. MR 1501931.
- Schaeffer, A. C. (1941). "Inequalities of A. Markoff and S. Bernstein for polynomials and related functions". Bull. Amer. Math. Soc. 47 (8): 565–579. doi:10.1090/s0002-9904-1941-07510-5. MR 0005163.
- with G. Szegő: Schaeffer, A. C.; Szeg{ö, G. (1941). "Inequalities for harmonic polynomials in two and three dimensions". Trans. Amer. Math. Soc. 50 (2): 187–225. doi:10.1090/s0002-9947-1941-0005164-7. MR 0005164.
- with G. E. Forsythe: Forsythe, G. E.; Schaeffer, A. C. (1942). "Remarks on regularity of methods of summation". Bull. Amer. Math. Soc. 48 (12): 863–865. doi:10.1090/s0002-9904-1942-07802-5. MR 0007063.
- with R. J. Duffin:
1. Duffin, R. J.; Schaeffer, A. C. (1937). "Some inequalities concerning functions of exponential type". Bull. Amer. Math. Soc. 43 (8): 554–556. doi:10.1090/s0002-9904-1937-06602-x. MR 1563585.
2. Schaeffer, A. C.; Duffin, R. J. (1938). "On some inequalities of S. Bernstein and W. Markoff for derivatives of polynomials". Bull. Am. Math. Soc. 44 (4): 289–297. doi:10.1090/S0002-9904-1938-06747-X. MR 1563728.
3. Duffin, Richard; Schaeffer, A. C. (1938). "Some properties of functions of exponential type". Bull. Amer. Math. Soc. 44 (4): 236–240. doi:10.1090/s0002-9904-1938-06725-0. MR 1563717.
4. Duffin, R. J.; Schaeffer, A. C. (1940). "On the extension of a functional inequality of S. Bernstein to non-analytic functions" (PDF). Bull. Amer. Math. Soc. 46 (4): 356–363. doi:10.1090/s0002-9904-1940-07222-2. MR 0001256.
5. Duffin, R. J.; Schaeffer, A. C. (1941-06-01). "Khinchin's problem in metric Diophantine approximation". Duke Mathematical Journal. 8 (2): 243–255. doi:10.1215/S0012-7094-41-00818-9. JFM 67.0145.03. S2CID 122007220. Zbl 0025.11002.
6. Duffin, R. J.; Schaeffer, A. C. (1941). "A refinement of the inequality of the brothers Markoff". Trans. Amer. Math. Soc. 50 (3): 517–528. doi:10.1090/s0002-9947-1941-0005942-4. MR 0005942.
7. Duffin, R. J.; Schaeffer, A. C. (1952). "A class of nonharmonic Fourier series". Trans. Amer. Math. Soc. 72 (2): 341–366. doi:10.1090/s0002-9947-1952-0047179-6. MR 0047179.
- Schaeffer, A. C.; Spencer, D. C. (1950), Coefficient Regions for Schlicht Functions, American Mathematical Society Colloquium Publications, Vol. 35, Providence, R.I.: American Mathematical Society, ISBN 978-0-8218-1035-4, MR 0037908

== See also ==
- Duffin–Schaeffer conjecture
