= K-frame =

In linear algebra, a k-frame is an ordered set of k linearly independent vectors in a vector space; thus, k ≤ n, where n is the dimension of the space, and an n-frame is precisely an ordered basis.

If the vectors are orthogonal, or orthonormal, the frame is called an orthogonal frame, or orthonormal frame, respectively.

== Properties ==
- The set of k-frames (particularly the set of orthonormal k-frames) in a given vector space X is known as the Stiefel manifold, and denoted V_{k}(X).
- A k-frame defines a parallelotope (a generalized parallelepiped); the volume can be computed via the Gram determinant.

== See also ==
- Frame (linear algebra)
- Frame of a vector space

=== Riemannian geometry ===
- Orthonormal frame
- Moving frame
