= Thermoelastic damping =

Thermoelastic damping is a source of intrinsic material damping due to thermoelasticity present in almost all materials. As the name thermoelastic suggests, it describes the coupling between the elastic field in the structure caused by deformation and the temperature field.

== Definition ==
In any vibrating structure, the strain field causes a change in the internal energy such that compressed region becomes hotter (assuming a positive coefficient of thermal expansion) and extended region becomes cooler. The mechanism responsible for thermoelastic damping is the resulting lack of thermal equilibrium between various parts of the vibrating structure. Energy is dissipated when irreversible heat flow driven by the temperature gradient occurs.

The earliest study of thermoelastic damping can be found in Clarence Zener’s classical work, in 1937, in which he studied thermoelastic damping in beams undergoing flexural vibrations. Flexural vibrations cause alternating tensile and compressive strains to build up on opposite sides of the neutral axis leading to a thermal imbalance. Irreversible heat flow which is driven by the temperature gradient causes vibrational energy to be dissipated.
