= Lalit Mohan Nath =

Bangladeshi nuclear physicist

- ললিত মোহন নাথ
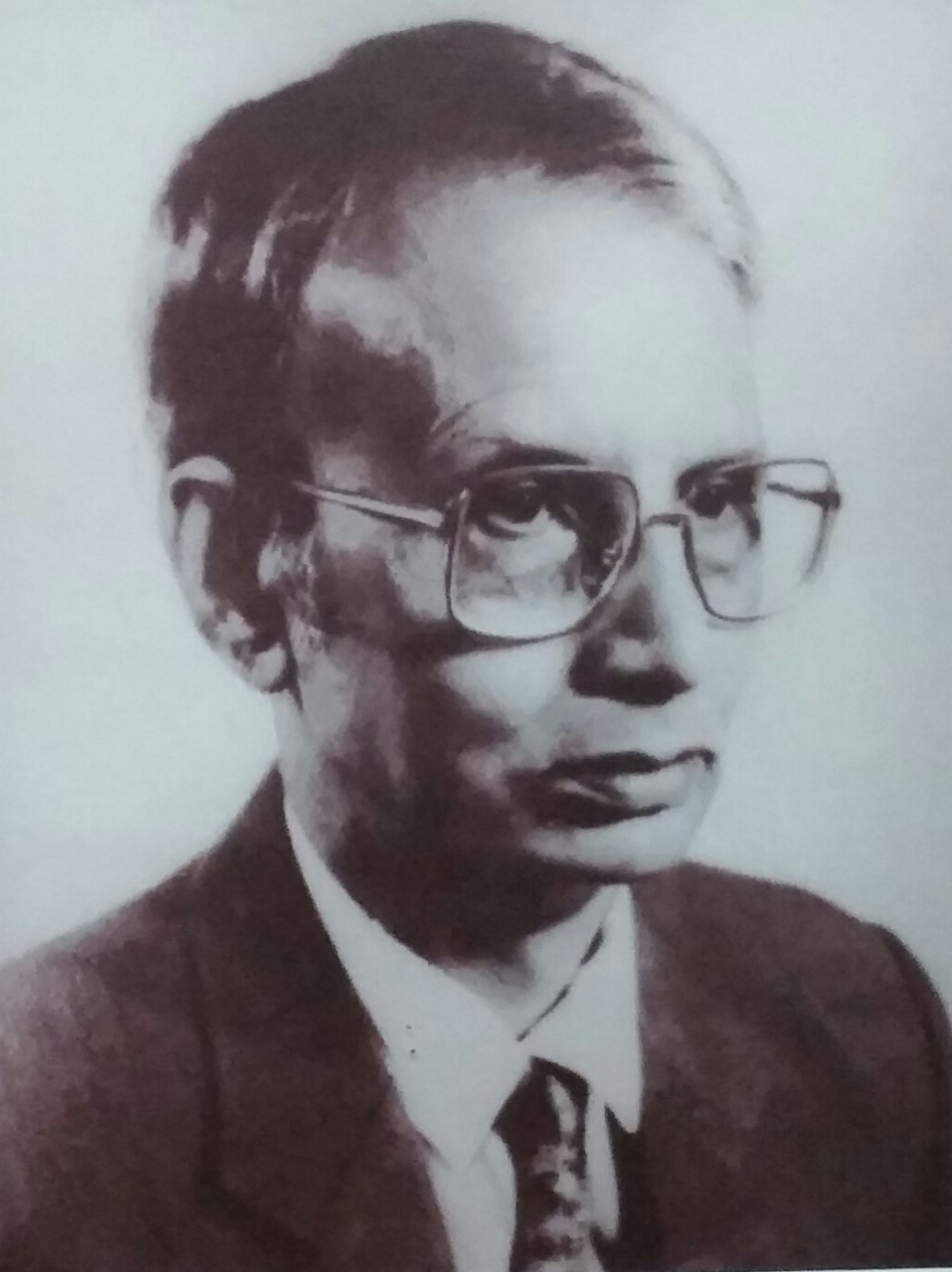
- Born: 1 November 1935; Chittagong, Bengal Presidency, British India
- Died: 2 July 2016 (aged 80); Dhaka, Bangladesh
- Education: Ph.D. (theoretical physics)
- Alma mater: University of Edinburgh; University of Dhaka
- Awards: Independence Day Award (2017)
- Scientific career
- Fields: Nuclear physics
- Workplaces: University of Dhaka; International Atomic Energy Agency; International Centre for Theoretical Physics; Pakistan Atomic Energy Commission; University of Florida; Purdue University; University of Western Ontario, Canada
- Doctoral advisor: Nicholas Kemmer; Peter W. Higgs

Lalit Mohan Nath (1 November 1935 – 2 July 2016) was a Bangladeshi nuclear physicist. He was a professor in the Department of Physics at the University of Dhaka.

== Early life ==
Nath obtained his B.Sc.(Hons.) degree in physics standing first in the First Class in order of merit and his M.Sc. degree in physics standing second in the First Class in order of merit. He then went to the University of Edinburgh to undertake work on electromagnetic interactions of charged particles in the quantum theory of fields of spin-one and -two particles, under the supervision of Nicholas Kemmer and Peter W. Higgs, and obtaining his Ph.D. in theoretical physics in 1964.

== Academic career ==
Nath joined the University of Dhaka, Bangladesh in September 1972 and served until June 2001. He became Professor of Physics in 1981 and became the Chairman of the Department of Physics from July 1994 until June 1996. He had also been the Provost of Jagannath Hall of the University of Dhaka from September 1983 until October 1986.

Nath was a visiting scholar at the University of Western Ontario, Canada during December 1971 to June 1972, at the Florida State University during August 1969 to November 1971 and at the Purdue University during September 1967 to August 1969.

Nath was an associate of the Abdus Salam International Center for Theoretical Physics (ICTP), Italy from January until August 1967. He also worked for some time in the Bangladesh Atomic Energy Commission as a senior scientific officer from December 1964 to December 1966.

Nath was a president of Bangladesh Puja Udjapan Parishad and Mahanagar Sarbojanin Puja Committee.

== Awards ==
- Razzaq-Shamsun Physics Prize
- Independence Day Award (2017)
