= Duffin–Schaeffer theorem =

Mathematical theorem

The Koukoulopoulos–Maynard theorem, historically known as the Duffin–Schaeffer conjecture, is a theorem in mathematics, specifically Diophantine approximation. It was proposed as a conjecture by R. J. Duffin and A. C. Schaeffer in 1941 and proven in 2019 by Dimitris Koukoulopoulos and James Maynard.

It states that if $f : \mathbb{N} \rightarrow \mathbb{R}^+$ is a real-valued function taking on positive values, then for almost all $\alpha$ (with respect to Lebesgue measure), the inequality

$$\left| \alpha - \frac{p}{q} \right| < \frac{f(q)}{q}$$

has infinitely many solutions in coprime integers $p,q$ with $q > 0$ if and only if

$$\sum_{q=1}^\infty \varphi(q) \frac{f(q)}{q} = \infty,$$

where $\varphi(q)$ is Euler's totient function.

A higher-dimensional analogue of this conjecture was resolved by Vaughan and Pollington in 1990.

== Introduction ==
That existence of the rational approximations implies divergence of the series follows from the Borel–Cantelli lemma. The converse implication is the crux of the conjecture.

There have been many partial results of the Duffin–Schaeffer conjecture established to date. Paul Erdős established in 1970 that the conjecture holds if there exists a constant $c > 0$ such that for every integer $n$ we have either $f(n) = c/n$ or $f(n) = 0$. This was strengthened by Jeffrey Vaaler in 1978 to the case $f(n) = O(n^{-1})$.

More recently, this was strengthened to the conjecture being true whenever there exists some $\varepsilon > 0$ such that the series

$$\sum_{n=1}^\infty \left(\frac{f(n)}{n}\right)^{1 + \varepsilon} \varphi(n) = \infty.$$

This was done by Haynes, Pollington, and Velani.

In 2006, Beresnevich and Velani proved that a Hausdorff measure analogue of the Duffin–Schaeffer conjecture is equivalent to the original Duffin–Schaeffer conjecture, which is a priori weaker. This result was published in the Annals of Mathematics.

== See also ==
- Khinchin's theorem
