= BZX79 voltage regulator diodes =

The BZX79 series is a family of low voltage regulator diode. The diode is made in axial-lead DO-35 glass package. Regulating voltages varies from 2.4 V to 75 V with a total power dissipation maximum of 500 mW.

In some datasheets, the series is labelled as zener diode, but this is not always the case as the series relies on avalanche breakdown for higher voltage.

The BZT52 series is a good surface-mount equivalent for the BZT79 series.

== Applications ==
Diodes in the BZX79 series are used as voltage references or low-voltage stabilizers.
