= Posynomial =

A posynomial, also known as a posinomial in some literature, is a function of the form

$$f(x_1, x_2, \dots, x_n) = \sum_{k=1}^K c_k x_1^{a_{1k}} \cdots x_n^{a_{nk}}$$

where all the coordinates $x_i$ and coefficients $c_k$ are positive real numbers, and the exponents $a_{ik}$ are real numbers. Posynomials are closed under addition, multiplication, and nonnegative scaling.

For example,

$$f(x_1, x_2, x_3) = 2.7 x_1^2x_2^{-1/3}x_3^{0.7} + 2x_1^{-4}x_3^{2/5}$$

is a posynomial.

Posynomials are not the same as polynomials in several independent variables. A polynomial's exponents must be non-negative integers, but its independent variables and coefficients can be arbitrary real numbers; on the other hand, a posynomial's exponents can be arbitrary real numbers, but its independent variables and coefficients must be positive real numbers. This terminology was introduced by Richard J. Duffin, Elmor L. Peterson, and Clarence Zener in their seminal book on geometric programming.

Posynomials are a special case of signomials, the latter not having the restriction that the $c_k$ be positive.
