= Riesz sequence =

In mathematics, a sequence of vectors (x_{n}) in a Hilbert space $(H,\langle\cdot,\cdot\rangle)$ is called a Riesz sequence if there exist constants $0<c\le C<\infty$ such that
$$c \sum_{n=1}^{\infty} | a_n|^2  \leq \left\Vert \sum_{n=1}^{\infty} a_n x_n \right\Vert^2 \leq C \sum_{n=1}^{\infty} | a_n|^2,$$
for every finite scalar sequence $\{a_n\}$ and hence, for all $\{a_n\}_{n=1}^{\infty}\in \ell^{2}$.

A Riesz sequence is called a Riesz basis if
$$\overline{\mathop{\rm span} (x_n)} = H.$$
Equivalently, a Riesz basis for $H$ is a family of the form $\left\{x_{n} \right\}_{n=1}^{\infty} = \left\{ Ue_{n} \right\}_{n=1}^{\infty}$, where $\left\{e_{n} \right\}_{n=1}^{\infty}$ is an orthonormal basis for $H$ and $U : H \rightarrow H$ is a bounded bijective operator. Subsequently, there exist constants $0<c\leq C < \infty$ such that
$$c \|f\|^2  \leq  \sum_{n=1}^{\infty} |\langle f, x_n \rangle|^2 \leq C \|f\|^2, \quad \forall f \in H.$$
Hence, Riesz bases need not be orthonormal, i.e., they are a generalization of orthonormal bases.

== Paley-Wiener criterion ==
Let $\{e_{n}\}$ be an orthonormal basis for a Hilbert space $H$ and let $\{x_{n}\}$ be "close" to $\{e_{n}\}$ in the sense that

$$\left\| \sum a_{i} (e_{i} - x_{i})\right\| \leq \lambda \sqrt{\sum |a_{i}|^{2}}$$

for some constant $\lambda$, $0 \leq \lambda < 1$, and arbitrary scalars $a_{1},\dotsc, a_{n}$ $(n = 1,2,3,\dotsc)$ . Then $\{x_{n}\}$ is a Riesz basis for $H$.

== Theorems ==
If H is a finite-dimensional space, then every basis of H is a Riesz basis.

Let $\varphi$ be in the L^{p} space L^{2}(R), let

$$\varphi_n(x) = \varphi(x-n)$$

and let $\hat{\varphi}$ denote the Fourier transform of ${\varphi}$. Define constants c and C with $0<c\le C<+\infty$. Then the following are equivalent:

$$1. \quad \forall (a_n) \in \ell^2,\ \ c\left( \sum_n | a_n|^2 \right) \leq \left\Vert \sum_n a_n \varphi_n \right\Vert^2 \leq C \left( \sum_n | a_n|^2 \right)$$

$$2. \quad c\leq\sum_{n}\left|\hat{\varphi}(\omega + 2\pi n)\right|^2\leq C$$

The first of the above conditions is the definition for (${\varphi_n}$) to form a Riesz basis for the space it spans.

== Kadec 1/4 Theorem ==
The Kadec 1/4 theorem, sometimes called the Kadets 1/4 theorem, provides a specific condition under which a sequence of complex exponentials forms a Riesz basis for the Lp space $L^2[-\pi, \pi]$. It is a foundational result in the theory of non-harmonic Fourier series.

Let $\Lambda = \{\lambda_n\}_{n \in \mathbb{Z}}$ be a sequence of real numbers such that

$$\sup_{n \in \mathbb{Z}} |\lambda_n - n| < \frac{1}{4}$$

Then the sequence of complex exponentials $\{e^{i \lambda_n t}\}_{n \in \mathbb{Z}}$ forms a Riesz basis for $L^2[-\pi, \pi]$.

This theorem demonstrates the stability of the standard orthonormal basis $\{e^{int}\}_{n \in \mathbb{Z}}$ (up to normalization) under perturbations of the frequencies $n$.

The constant 1/4 is sharp; if $\sup_{n \in \mathbb{Z}} |\lambda_n - n| = 1/4$, the sequence may fail to be a Riesz basis, such as:
$$\lambda_n= \begin{cases}n-\frac{1}{4}, & n>0 \\ 0, & n=0 \\ n+\frac{1}{4}, & n<0\end{cases}$$
When $\Lambda = \{\lambda_n\}_{n \in \mathbb{Z}}$ are allowed to be complex, the theorem holds under the condition $\sup_{n \in \mathbb{Z}} |\lambda_n - n| < \frac{\log 2}{\pi}$. Whether the constant is sharp is an open question.

== See also ==
- Orthonormal basis
- Hilbert space
- Frame of a vector space
