= Mikhail Kadets =

Ukrainian mathematician (1923–2011)

- Born: 30 November 1923; Kiev, Ukraine SSR, Soviet Union
- Died: 7 March 2011 (aged 87); Kharkiv, Ukraine
- Citizenship: Ukraine
- Education: Kharkov University
- Known for: Banach–Fréchet problem Kadets 1/4-theorem Kadets–Snobar estimate
- Scientific career
- Fields: Banach spaces harmonic analysis
- Doctoral advisor: Boris Levin

Mikhail Iosiphovich Kadets (Russian: Михаил Иосифович Кадец, Ukrainian: Михайло Йосипович Кадець, sometimes transliterated as Kadec, 30 November 1923 – 7 March 2011) was a Soviet-born Jewish mathematician working in analysis and the theory of Banach spaces.

== Life and work ==
Kadets was born in Kyiv. In 1943, he was drafted into the army. After demobilisation in 1946, he studied at Kharkov University, graduating in 1950. After several years in Makeevka he returned to Kharkov in 1957, where he spent the remainder of his life working at various institutes. He defended his PhD in 1955 (under the supervision of Boris Levin), and his doctoral dissertation in 1963. He was awarded the State Prize of Ukraine in 2005.

After reading the Ukrainian translation of Banach's monograph Théorie des Opérations Linéaires, he became interested in the theory of Banach spaces. In 1966, Kadets solved in the affirmative the Banach–Fréchet problem, asking whether every two separable infinite-dimensional Banach spaces are homeomorphic. He developed the method of equivalent norms, which has found numerous applications. For example, he showed that every separable Banach space admits an equivalent Fréchet differentiable norm if and only if the dual space is separable.

Together with Aleksander Pełczyński, he obtained important results on the topological structure of Lp spaces.

Kadets also made several contributions to the theory of finite-dimensional normed spaces. Together with M. G. Snobar (1971), he showed that every $n$-dimensional subspace of a Banach space is the image of a projection of norm at most $\sqrt{n}.$ Together with V. I. Gurarii and V. I. Matsaev, he found the exact order of magnitude of the Banach–Mazur distance between the $n$-dimensional spaces $\ell^n_p$ and $\ell^n_q.$

In harmonic analysis, Kadets proved (1964) what is now called the Kadets $1/4$ theorem, which states that, if $|\lambda_n - n| \leq C < 1/4$ for all integers $n,$ then the sequence $(\exp(i \lambda_n x))_{n \in \Z}$ is a Riesz basis in $L_2[-\pi, \pi]$

Kadets was the founder of the Kharkov school of Banach spaces.

Together with his son Vladimir Kadets, he authored two books about series in Banach spaces.
