= Geometric programming =

Optimization problem

A geometric program (GP) is an optimization problem of the form

$$\begin{array}{ll}
\mbox{minimize} & f_0(x) \\
\mbox{subject to} & f_i(x) \leq 1, \quad i=1, \ldots, m\\
& g_i(x) = 1, \quad i=1, \ldots, p,
\end{array}$$

where $f_0,\dots,f_m$ are posynomials and $g_1,\dots,g_p$ are monomials. In the context of geometric programming (unlike standard mathematics), a monomial is a function from $\mathbb{R}_{++}^n$ to $\mathbb{R}$ defined as

$$x \mapsto c x_1^{a_1} x_2^{a_2} \cdots x_n^{a_n}$$

where $c > 0 \$ and $a_i \in \mathbb{R}$. A posynomial is any sum of monomials.

Geometric programming is closely related to convex optimization: any GP can be made convex by means of a change of variables. GPs have numerous applications, including component sizing in IC design, aircraft design, maximum likelihood estimation for logistic regression in statistics, and parameter tuning of positive linear systems in control theory.

== Convex form ==
Geometric programs are not in general convex optimization problems, but they can be transformed to convex problems by a change of variables and a transformation of the objective and constraint functions. In particular, after performing the change of variables $y_i = \log(x_i)$ and taking the log of the objective and constraint functions, the functions $f_i$, i.e., the posynomials, are transformed into log-sum-exp functions, which are convex, and the functions $g_i$, i.e., the monomials, become affine. Hence, this transformation transforms every GP into an equivalent convex program. In fact, this log-log transformation can be used to convert a larger class of problems, known as log-log convex programming (LLCP), into an equivalent convex form.

== Software ==
Several software packages exist to assist with formulating and solving geometric programs.

- MOSEK is a commercial solver capable of solving geometric programs as well as other non-linear optimization problems.
- CVXOPT is an open-source solver for convex optimization problems.
- GPkit is a Python package for cleanly defining and manipulating geometric programming models. There are a number of example GP models written with this package here.
- GGPLAB is a MATLAB toolbox for specifying and solving geometric programs (GPs) and generalized geometric programs (GGPs).
- CVXPY is a Python-embedded modeling language for specifying and solving convex optimization problems, including GPs, GGPs, and LLCPs.

== See also ==
- Signomial
- Clarence Zener
