= Karl Zener =

American Perceptual Psychologist

- Born: April 22, 1903; Indianapolis, Indiana, US
- Died: September 27, 1964 (aged 61)

Academic background
- Education: University of Chicago (Ph.B.); Harvard University (MA, PhD)

Academic work
- Discipline: Psychologist
- Sub-discipline: Classical conditioning; Perceptual psychology
- Institutions: Duke University

Early parapsychological research used Zener cards in experiments designed to test for the existence of telepathic communication.

Karl Edward Zener (April 22, 1903 – September 27, 1964) was an American perceptual psychologist best known for his affiliation with Dr. Joseph Banks Rhine and their work in the field of extra-sensory perception (ESP).

== Biography ==
Zener was born in Indianapolis, Indiana the son of German-descent Clarence and Ida Zener, and brother of Katherine (later Mrs. Katherine Humiston) and Clarence (later Dr. Clarence Zener). He received a Ph.B. from the University of Chicago in 1923, followed by M.A. and Ph.D. degrees in psychology from Harvard University in 1924 and 1926. His doctoral thesis was on the psychology of music. He then went on to spend a year as a United States National Research Council Fellow at the University of Berlin before returning to the U.S. After a year of teaching psychology at Princeton University, Zener took up what was to be a lifelong post with Duke University, in Durham, North Carolina.

The main thrust of Zener's work over the next ten years concerned conditioned responses, and during the 1930s he maintained one of the few Pavlovian conditioning laboratories in the U.S. It was also during this time that, along with colleague J. B. Rhine, he devised the card symbols that were used by Rhine in early ESP tests. Rhine called cards bearing these symbols "Zener cards" in honor of his colleague.

Zener's later work focused on theories of perception and the analysis of perceptual experience. With research partner Dr. Mercedes Gaffron, he identified previously unknown aspects of visual processing and comprehension. The resultant Zener-Gaffron theory combined a psychological analysis of perception with then-contemporary findings from the field of biological neuroscience.

Zener was the recipient of the only grant ever given for psychological research by the Ford Foundation Program in Humanities and the Arts. Zener was appointed Chairman of the Department of Psychology at Duke University in 1961, after having served there as the director of graduate studies in psychology for nearly twenty years.

The Zener Auditorium (Room 130, Sociology-Psychology Building) of Duke University is named after him.

== Personal life ==
Zener married Ann Adams and the couple had three sons: Dr. Karl A. Zener, Dr. Julian C. Zener, and Wilfred Zener. Wilfred, however, died in a tragic drowning accident in 1956.
