= Clarence Zener =

American physicist (1905–1993)

- Born: Clarence Melvin Zener; December 1, 1905; Indianapolis, Indiana, U.S.
- Died: July 2, 1993 (aged 87); Pittsburgh, Pennsylvania, U.S.
- Education: Harvard University (PhD)
- Known for: Zener effect (1934); Work on thermoelastic damping (1937)
- Relatives: Karl Zener (brother)
- Awards: Bingham Medal (1957); John Price Wetherill Medal (1959)
- Scientific career
- Fields: Physics
- Workplaces: See list: University of Bristol (1932–1934); Washington University in St. Louis (1935–1937); City College of New York (1937–1940); Washington State University (1940–1942); Watertown Arsenal (1942–1945); University of Chicago (1945–1951); Westinghouse Electric Corporation (1951–1965); Texas A&M University (1966–1968); Carnegie Mellon University (1968–1993)
- Thesis: Quantum Mechanics of the Formation of Certain Types of Diatomic Molecules (1929)
- Doctoral advisor: Edwin Kemble
- Doctoral students: John B. Goodenough (1952)

Clarence Melvin Zener (/ˈziːnər/ ZEE-ner; December 1, 1905 – July 2, 1993) was an American physicist who in 1934 was the first to describe the property concerning the breakdown of electrical insulators. These findings were later exploited by Bell Labs in the development of the Zener diode, which was duly named after him.

Zener was also a theoretical physicist with a background in mathematics who conducted research in a wide range of subjects including: superconductivity, metallurgy, ferromagnetism, elasticity, fracture mechanics, diffusion, and geometric programming.

== Life ==
Zener was born in Indianapolis, Indiana, the son of German-descent Clarence and Ida Zener, and brother of Katharine Zener (later Katharine Hurmiston) and psychologist Karl Zener, and earned his PhD in physics under Edwin C. Kemble at the Harvard Graduate School of Arts and Sciences in 1929. His thesis was titled Quantum Mechanics of the Formation of Certain Types of Diatomic Molecules. In 1957 he received the Bingham Medal for his work in rheology, in 1959 the John Price Wetherill Medal from the Franklin Institute, in 1965 the Albert Souveur Achievement Award, in 1974 the Gold Medal from American Society for Metals, in 1982 the Von Hippel Award from the Materials Research Society, and in 1985 received the ICIFUAS (International Conference on Internal Friction and Ultrasonic Attenuation in Solids) Prize for the discovery of the Zener effect, pioneering studies of anelasticity in metals and prediction and observation of thermoelastic damping. ICIFUAS Prize was later renamed after Zener, following his death in 1993. A notable doctoral student of Zener's was John B. Goodenough, Nobel Prize winner in chemistry in 2019, and Arthur Nowick held a postdoctoral appointment under Zener.

Zener was a research fellow at the University of Bristol from 1932 to 1934. He taught in Arts and Sciences at Washington University in St. Louis (1935–1937), the City College of New York (1937–1940), and Washington State University (1940–1942) before working at the Watertown Arsenal during World War II. After the war, he taught at University of Chicago (1945–1951) where he was professor of physics, before being appointed as director of science at Pittsburgh's Westinghouse Electric Corporation (1951–1965). Here he developed his system of geometric programming, which he used to solve engineering problems using adjustable parameters, defined by mathematical functions. Using this, Zener modeled designs for heat exchangers, to perform ocean thermal energy conversion, and discovered the most suitable areas for their deployment; many of these models are still being used today. Following his career at Westinghouse, Zener returned to teaching, leaving Pittsburgh briefly to become a professor at Texas A&M University (1966–1968) but returned to finish his career at Carnegie Mellon University (1968–1993).

== Personality ==
Zener was known both for his dislike of experimental work and for preferring to work on practical problems within the arena of applied physics. Although he had a reputation of being very successful in these endeavors, he apparently considered himself as being less qualified to work on purely theoretical physics problems. In recognition of this, he once commented, after having dined with physicist J. Robert Oppenheimer: "when it came to fundamental physics, it was clear there was no point in competing with a person like that."

== Eponyms ==
- Zener effect
- Zener diode
- Zener pinning
- Zener–Hollomon parameter
- Landau–Zener formula
- Zener double-exchange mechanism
- Zener ratio, an elastic anisotropy factor for cubic crystals
- Zener model for viscoelastic solids

== See also ==
- Bloch oscillation
- Mist lift
- Posynomial
- Slater's rules
