= Dimitris Koukoulopoulos =

Greek mathematician (born 1984)

- Born: 1984 (age 41–42)
- Education: Aristotle University of Thessaloniki (BA); University of Illinois at Urbana–Champaign (MS, PhD)
- Known for: Proving the Duffin-Schaeffer conjecture
- Scientific career
- Fields: Analytic number theory
- Workplaces: University of Montreal
- Website: https://dms.umontreal.ca/~koukoulo/

Dimitris Koukoulopoulos (born 1984) is a Greek mathematician working in analytic number theory as a professor at the University of Montreal.

In 2019, in joint work with James Maynard, he proved the Duffin-Schaeffer conjecture.

He was an invited speaker at the 2022 International Congress of Mathematicians.

He was the 2022 recipient of the Ribenboim Prize of the Canadian Number Theory Association.

== Publications ==
- Koukoulopoulos, Dimitris (2019). The distribution of prime numbers. Providence, Rhode Island: American Mathematical Society. ISBN 978-1-4704-4754-0. OCLC 1113143297.
