= Zener effect =

Type of electrical breakdown in semiconductors

The I–V curve for a diode showing avalanche and Zener breakdown.

In electronics, the Zener effect (employed most notably in the appropriately named Zener diode) is a type of electrical breakdown, discovered by Clarence Melvin Zener. It occurs in a reverse biased p-n diode when the electric field enables tunneling of electrons from the valence to the conduction band of a semiconductor, leading to numerous free charge carriers which suddenly increase the reverse current.

== Mechanism ==
Under a high reverse-bias voltage, the p-n junction's depletion region widens which leads to a high-strength electric field across the junction. Sufficiently strong electric fields enable tunneling of electrons across the depletion region of a semiconductor, leading to numerous free charge carriers. This sudden generation of carriers rapidly increases the reverse current and gives rise to the high slope conductance of the Zener diode.

== Relationship to the avalanche effect ==
The Zener effect is distinct from avalanche breakdown. Avalanche breakdown involves minority carrier electrons in the transition region being accelerated by the electric field, to energies sufficient for freeing electron-hole pairs via collisions with bound electrons. The Zener and the avalanche effect may occur simultaneously or independently of one another. In general, diode junction breakdowns occurring below 5 volts are caused by the Zener effect, whereas breakdowns occurring above 5 volts are caused by the avalanche effect. Breakdowns occurring at voltages close to 5 V are usually caused by some combination of the two effects. Zener breakdown is found to occur at electric field intensity of about 3×10^{7} V/m. Zener breakdown occurs in heavily doped junctions (p-type semiconductor moderately doped and n-type heavily doped), which produces a narrow depletion region. The avalanche breakdown occurs in lightly doped junctions, which produce a wider depletion region. Temperature increase in the junction increases the contribution of the Zener effect to breakdown, and decreases the contribution of the avalanche effect.
