= Dialnorm =

Loudness metadata parameter

Dialnorm is the metadata parameter that controls playback gain within the Dolby Laboratories Dolby Digital (AC-3) audio compression system. Dialnorm stands for dialog normalization. Dialnorm is an integer value with range 1 to 31 corresponding to a playback gain of −30 to 0 dB (unity) respectively. Higher values afford more headroom and are appropriate for dynamic material such as an action film.

Dolby recommends that the dialnorm value be determined by measurement of average dialog level in the program. The recommended metering approach uses a power sum of the A-weighted audio level in all channels. If every producer and distributor uses this method, consumer dialog levels will be consistent from program to program and channel to channel. The dialog levels will be normalized.

== Historical basis ==
Audio levels within phonograph, tape and broadcasting have traditionally been adjusted to keep peak levels within the physical and legal modulation limits of the medium. While this practice has resulted in relatively consistent dialog levels and has minimized audibility of channel noise, it has invited the use of excessive audio compression and resulting limited dynamic range.

Digital recording has eliminated the concern for noise, but the lack of a standard for digital audio level has resulted in compact disc recordings and portable music player files with inconsistent average levels. Increasingly, digital music is excessively compressed, to ensure that the selection is not perceived by the listener as being too soft in comparison with other sources, a trend known as the loudness war.

Dolby Laboratories sought to provide wide dynamic range and consistent audio levels in the Dolby Digital encoding system. One approach would have been to require audio levels at the encoder input to be adjusted to a fixed value. Instead, AC3 allows producers to choose input level over a wide range, by including a required dialnorm value representing the measured dialog level of the input signal.

== Use within US digital television ==
The Dolby Laboratories recommendation for dialnorm has the force of law for US Digital Broadcasting, through the FCC's adoption of ATSC A/53 Annex B, section 5.5 Dialogue Level: "The value of the dialnorm parameter in the AC-3 elementary bit stream shall indicate the level of average spoken dialogue within the encoded audio program."

Many broadcasters were unaware of this requirement and did not initially configure their encoding equipment for a proper dialnorm value. Many broadcasters also lacked the means to measure average dialog level and the means to implement a matching dialnorm value for each program. The result was a wide disparity in audio levels when changing between digital broadcast channels through over-the-air and cable distribution.

== Development of BS.1770 ==
While appropriate for the measurement of dialog loudness, the A-weighted measurement originally used for determination of the dialnorm parameter is not suitable for the measurement of music loudness. In response, in 2006 the International Telecommunication Union (ITU) developed ITU-R BS.1770: "Algorithms to measure audio programme loudness and true-peak audio level". This technique utilizes a weighting curve with a smaller amount of low frequency de-emphasis, and introduces a peaking emphasis to compensate for the boost in loudness perception caused by the shape of the human head.

A new revision was ratified in 2011 (BS.1770-2) which implements a gated loudness algorithm. This new step, contributed by the EBU PLOUD committee, stipulates additional processing to allow selection of the audio segment to be measured.

== Development of ATSC A/85 ==
In November 2009 the ATSC released recommended practice A/85: "Techniques for Establishing and Maintaining Audio Loudness for Digital Television". This document was developed to improve understanding of program loudness, the dialnorm parameter, appropriate management techniques and options for system implementation. This document also introduced BS.1770 as a replacement for the previous A-weighted measurement technique.

== Impact of CALM Act ==
In response to consumer complaints about loud commercials, in December 2010, the Commercial Advertisement Loudness Mitigation Act or the CALM Act was signed into federal law. It directs the Federal Communications Commission (FCC) to prescribe a regulation limiting the volume of television advertisements transmitted by a television broadcast station, cable operator, or other multichannel video programming distributor. The act requires the FCC to prescribe regulations consistent with ATSC A/85, and its successors. The FCC has not yet issued rules to implement the act.

== Alternatives ==
- DRC (Dynamic Range Control) and dialogue metadata of HE-AAC and xHE-AAC
- DRC and dialogue metadata of Eclipsa Audio
