= Peak meter =

Type of audio signal measurement device

Two different styles of meters: a set of VU meters from a Nakamichi cassette deck, and a set of digital peak meters from a Harman Kardon cassette deck.

A peak meter is a type of measuring instrument that visually indicates the instantaneous level of an audio signal that is passing through it (a sound level meter). In sound reproduction, the meter, whether peak or not, is usually meant to correspond to the perceived loudness of a particular signal. The term peak is used to denote the meter's ability, regardless of the type of visual display, to indicate the highest output level at any instant.

A peak-reading electrical instrument or meter is one which measures the peak value of a waveform, rather than its mean value or RMS value.

As an example, when making audio recordings it is desirable to use a recording level that is just sufficient to reach the maximum capability of the recorder at the loudest sounds, regardless of the average sound level. A peak-reading meter is typically used to set the recording level.

== Implementation ==
In modern audio equipment, peak meters are usually made up of a series of LEDs (small lights) that are placed in a vertical or horizontal bar and lit up sequentially as the signal increases. They typically have ranges of green, yellow, and red, to indicate when a signal is starting to overload.

A meter can be implemented with a classic moving needle device such as those on older analog equipment (similar in appearance in some ways to a pressure gauge on a bicycle pump), or by other means. Older equipment used actual moving parts instead of lights to indicate the audio level. Because of the mass of the moving parts and mechanics, the response time of these older meters could have been anywhere from a few milliseconds to a second or more. Thus, the meter might not ever accurately reflect the signal at every instant of time, but the constantly changing level, combined with the slower response time, led to more of an average indication.

By comparison, a peak meter is designed to respond so quickly that the meter display reacts in exact proportion to the voltage of the audio signal. This can be useful in many applications, but the human ear works much more like an average meter than a peak meter. The analog VU meters are actually closer to the human ear's perception of sound level because the response time was intentionally slow - around 300 milliseconds, and thus, many audio engineers and sound professionals prefer to use older analog style metering because it more accurately relates to what a human listener will experience in terms of relative loudness.

== See also ==
- Audio equipment
- Decibel § Acoustics
- Peak programme meter – A quasi-peak audio level meter originally developed in the 1930s
