= Loudness war =

Increasing audio levels in recorded music

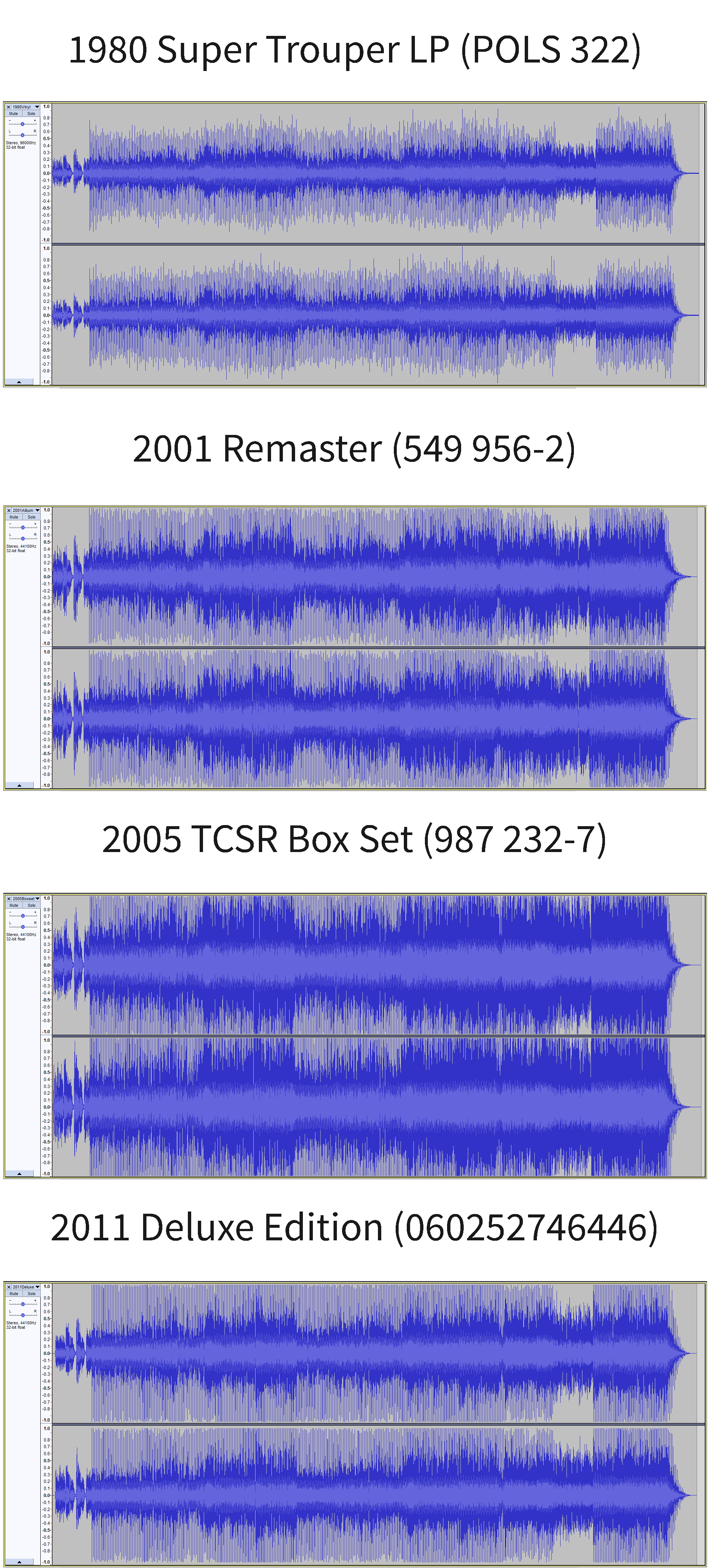
Different releases of ABBA's 1980 song "Super Trouper" show different levels of loudness compared to the original 1980 release. This is displayed in Audacity.

The loudness war (or loudness race) is a trend of increasing audio levels in recorded music, which reduces audio fidelity and—according to many critics—listener enjoyment. Increasing loudness was first reported as early as the 1940s, with respect to mastering practices for 7-inch singles. The maximum peak level of analog recordings such as these is limited by varying specifications of electronic equipment along the chain from source to listener, including vinyl and cassette players. The issue garnered renewed attention starting in the 1990s with the introduction of digital signal processing capable of producing further loudness increases.

With the advent of the compact disc (CD), music is encoded to a digital format with a clearly defined maximum peak amplitude. Once the maximum amplitude of a CD is reached, loudness can be increased still further through signal processing techniques such as dynamic range compression and equalization. Engineers can apply an increasingly high ratio of compression to a recording until it peaks more frequently at the maximum amplitude, a technique colloquially known as brickwalling. In extreme cases, efforts to increase loudness can result in clipping and other audible distortion. Modern recordings that use extreme dynamic range compression and other measures to increase loudness therefore can sacrifice sound quality to loudness. The competitive escalation of loudness has led music fans and members of the musical press to refer to the affected albums as "victims of the loudness war".

== History ==
While most critics trace the beginning of the loudness war to the introduction of the CD in the 1980s, the practice of focusing on loudness in audio mastering had been documented before that; when the vinyl phonograph record was the primary released recording medium and when 7-inch singles were played on jukebox machines in clubs and bars. The so-called wall of sound (inspired by Phil Spector's Wall of Sound production technique) formula preceded the loudness war, but achieved its goal using a variety of techniques, such as instrument doubling and reverberation, as well as compression.

Jukeboxes became popular in the 1940s and were often set to a predetermined level by the owner, so any record that was mastered louder than the others would stand out. Similarly, starting in the 1950s, producers would request louder 7-inch singles so that songs would stand out when auditioned by program directors for radio stations. In particular, many Motown records pushed the limits of how loud records could be made; according to one of their engineers, they were "notorious for cutting some of the hottest 45s in the industry." In the 1960s and 1970s, compilation albums of hits by multiple different artists became popular, and if artists and producers found their song was quieter than others on the compilation, they would insist that their song be remastered to be competitive.

Because of the limitations of the vinyl format, the ability to manipulate loudness was also limited. Attempts to achieve extreme loudness could render the medium unplayable. One example was the hot master of Led Zeppelin II by mastering engineer Bob Ludwig which caused some cartridges to mistrack; the album was recalled and issued with lower compression levels. Digital media such as CDs remove these restrictions and as a result, increasing loudness levels have been a more severe issue in the CD era. Modern computer-based digital audio effects processing allows mastering engineers to have greater direct control over the loudness of a song: for example, a brick-wall limiter can look ahead at an upcoming signal to limit its level.

Three different releases of ZZ Top's song "Sharp Dressed Man" show increasing loudness over time: 1983–2000–2008.

=== 1980s ===
The 1980s saw the advent of the CD, which allowed for higher dynamic range than previous analog formats. This encouraged mastering engineers to make use of the potential of the then-new format, even though much of the industry was yet to know how to best optimize for the CD. The common practice of mastering music for CD at the time involved matching the highest peak of a recording at, or close to, digital full scale, and referring to digital levels along the lines of more familiar analog VU meters. When using VU meters, a certain point (usually -18 or −20 dB below the disc's maximum amplitude) was used in the same way as the saturation point (signified as 0 dB) of analog recording, with several dB of the CD's recording level reserved for amplitude exceeding the saturation point (often referred to as the red zone, signified by a red bar in the meter display), because digital media cannot exceed 0 decibels relative to full scale (dBFS). The average RMS level of the average rock song during most of the decade was around −16.8 dBFS.

=== 1990s ===
By the early 1990s, mastering engineers had learned how to optimize for the CD medium and the loudness war had not yet begun in earnest. However, CDs with louder audio levels had already begun to surface, with the levels becoming more and more likely to bump up to the digital limit, (Note: Up to 2 or 4 consecutive full-scale samples was considered acceptable.) resulting in recordings where the peaks on an average rock or beat-heavy pop CD hovered near 0 dBFS, (Note: Usually in the range of −3 dB.) but only occasionally reached it.

The concept of making music releases hotter began to appeal to people within the industry, in part because of how noticeably louder some releases had become and also in part because the industry believed that customers preferred louder-sounding CDs, even though that may not have been true. Engineers, musicians, and labels each developed their own ideas of how CDs could be made louder. In 1994, the first digital brick-wall limiter with look-ahead (the Waves L1) was mass-produced; this feature, since then, has been commonly incorporated in digital mastering limiters and maximizers. (Note: Look-ahead is a window of time in which the processor analyzes the audio amplitude in advance and predicts the amount of gain reduction needed to meet the requested output level (0 dBFS); this permits the limiter to react to incoming transients avoiding clipping. Since an audio buffer is needed to achieve this, look-ahead is only possible in the digital domain and introduces a small amount of latency to the output signal.) While the increase in CD loudness was gradual throughout the 1990s, some opted to push the format to the limit, such as on Oasis's widely popular album (What's the Story) Morning Glory?, whose RMS level averaged −8 dBFS on many of its tracks—a rare occurrence, especially in the year it was released (1995). Red Hot Chili Peppers's Californication (1999) represented another milestone, with prominent clipping occurring throughout the album.

=== 2000s ===
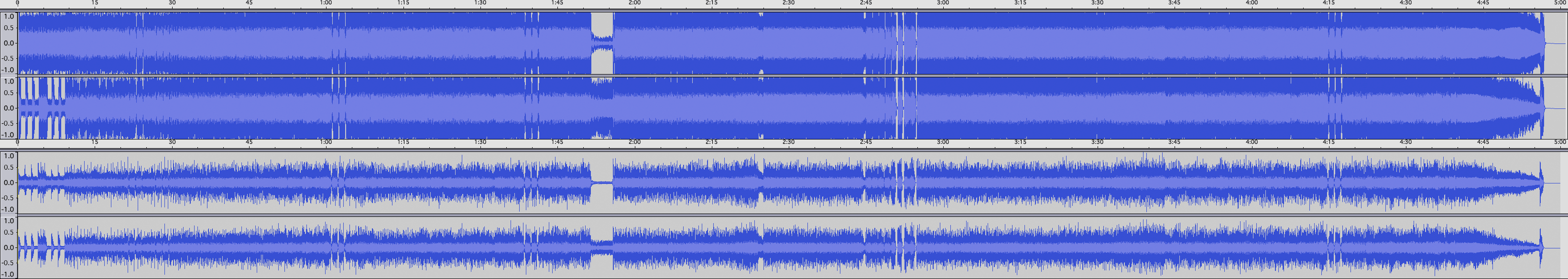
Waveform envelopes comparison showing how the CD release of Death Magnetic (top) employed heavy compression resulting in higher average levels than the Guitar Hero downloadable version (bottom)

By the early 2000s, the loudness war had become fairly widespread, especially with some remastered re-releases and greatest hits collections of older music. In 2008, loud mastering practices received mainstream media attention with the release of Metallica's Death Magnetic album. The CD version of the album has a high average loudness that pushes peaks beyond the point of digital clipping, causing distortion. This was reported by customers and music industry professionals, and covered in multiple international publications, including Rolling Stone, The Wall Street Journal, BBC Radio, Wired, and The Guardian. Ted Jensen, a mastering engineer involved in the Death Magnetic recordings, criticized the approach employed during the production process. When a version of the album without dynamic range compression was included in the downloadable content for the video game Guitar Hero III, copies of this version were actively sought out by those who had already purchased the official CD release. The Guitar Hero version of the album songs exhibit much higher dynamic range and less clipping than those on the CD release, as can be seen from the illustration.

In late 2008, mastering engineer Bob Ludwig offered three versions of the Guns N' Roses album Chinese Democracy for approval to co-producers Axl Rose and Caram Costanzo. They selected the one with the least compression. Ludwig wrote, "I was floored when I heard they decided to go with my full dynamics version and the loudness-for-loudness-sake versions be damned." Ludwig said the "fan and press backlash against the recent heavily compressed recordings finally set the context for someone to take a stand and return to putting music and dynamics above sheer level."

=== 2010s ===
In March 2010, mastering engineer Ian Shepherd organised the first Dynamic Range Day, a day of online activity intended to raise awareness of the issue and promote the idea that "Dynamic music sounds better". The day was a success and its follow-ups in the following years have built on this, gaining industry support from companies like SSL, Bowers & Wilkins, TC Electronic and Shure as well as engineers like Bob Ludwig, Guy Massey and Steve Lillywhite. Shepherd cited research showing there was no connection between sales and loudness, and that people preferred more dynamic music. He also argued that file-based loudness normalization will eventually render the war irrelevant.

One of the biggest albums of 2013 was Daft Punk's Random Access Memories, with many reviews commenting on the album's great sound. Mixing engineer Mick Guzauski deliberately chose to use less compression on the project, commenting "We never tried to make it loud and I think it sounds better for it." In January 2014, the album won five Grammy Awards, including Best Engineered Album (Non-Classical).

Analysis in the early 2010s suggested that the loudness trend may have peaked around 2005 and subsequently reduced, with a pronounced increase in dynamic range (both overall and minimum) for albums since 2005.

In 2013, mastering engineer Bob Katz predicted that the loudness war would be over by mid-2014, claiming that mandatory use of Sound Check by Apple would lead to producers and mastering engineers to turn down the level of their songs to the standard level, or Apple will do it for them. He believed this would eventually result in producers and engineers making more dynamic masters to take account of this factor.

Earache Records reissued much of its catalog as part of its Full Dynamic Range series, intended to counteract the loudness war and ensure that fans hear the music as it was intended.

=== 2020s ===
By the late 2010s/early 2020s, most major streaming services began normalizing audio by default, which can be turned off if not wanted. Target loudness for normalization varies by platform:

Audio normalization per streaming service
Service	Loudness (measured in LUFS)
Amazon Music	−13 LUFS
Apple Music	−16 LUFS
SoundCloud	−14 LUFS
Spotify	−14 LUFS, −11 and −19 available in premium
Tidal	−14 (default) or −18 LUFS
YouTube	−14 LUFS
YouTube Music	−7 LUFS

Measured LUFS may further vary among streaming services due to differing measurement systems and adjustment algorithms. For example, Amazon, Tidal, and YouTube do not increase the volume of tracks.

Some services do not normalize audio; Bandcamp is an example.

Despite the widespread adoption of loudness normalization, at least one critic has argued that the loudness war did not end but evolved. Mastering engineers have continued to master tracks for maximum loudness using aggressive compression combined with targeted equalization, rather than simple peak limiting, since a track is typically mastered assuming non-normalized playback even though most listeners now experience normalized audio.

== Radio broadcasting ==
When music is broadcast over radio, the station applies its own signal processing, further reducing the dynamic range of the material to closely match levels of absolute amplitude, regardless of the original recording's loudness.

Competition for listeners between radio stations has contributed to a loudness war in radio broadcasting. Loudness jumps between television broadcast channels and between programmes within the same channel, and between programs and intervening adverts are a frequent source of audience complaints. The European Broadcasting Union has addressed this issue in the EBU PLOUD Group with publication of the EBU R 128 recommendation. In the U.S., legislators passed the CALM act, which led to enforcement of the formerly voluntary ATSC A/85 standard for loudness management.

== Criticism ==
In 2007, Suhas Sreedhar published an article about the loudness war in the engineering magazine IEEE Spectrum. Sreedhar said that the greater possible dynamic range of CDs was being set aside in favor of maximizing loudness using digital technology. Sreedhar said that the over-compressed modern music was fatiguing, that it did not allow the music to breathe.

The production practices associated with the loudness war have been condemned by recording industry professionals including Alan Parsons and Geoff Emerick, along with mastering engineers Doug Sax, Stephen Marcussen, and Bob Katz. Musician Bob Dylan has also condemned the practice, saying, "You listen to these modern records, they're atrocious, they have sound all over them. There's no definition of nothing, no vocal, no nothing, just like—static." Music critics have complained about excessive compression. The Rick Rubin–produced albums Californication and Death Magnetic have been criticised for loudness by The Guardian; the latter was also criticised by Audioholics. Stylus Magazine said the former suffered from so much digital clipping that "even non-audiophile consumers complained about it".

Opponents have called for immediate changes in the music industry regarding the level of loudness. In August 2006, Angelo Montrone, the vice-president of A&R for One Haven Music (a Sony Music company), in an open letter decrying the loudness war, claimed that mastering engineers are being forced against their will or are preemptively making releases louder to get the attention of industry heads. Some bands are being petitioned by the public to re-release their music with less distortion.

The nonprofit organization Turn Me Up! was created by Charles Dye, John Ralston, and Allen Wagner in 2007 with the aim of certifying albums that contain a suitable level of dynamic range and encourage the sale of quieter records by placing a Turn Me Up! sticker on certified albums. As of 2019, the group has not produced an objective method for determining what will be certified.

A hearing researcher at House Ear Institute is concerned that the loudness of new albums could possibly harm listeners' hearing, particularly that of children. The Journal of General Internal Medicine has published a paper suggesting increasing loudness may be a risk factor in hearing loss.

A two-minute YouTube video addressing this issue by audio engineer Matt Mayfield has been referenced by The Wall Street Journal and the Chicago Tribune. Pro Sound Web quoted Mayfield, "When there is no quiet, there can be no loud."

The book Perfecting Sound Forever: An Aural History of Recorded Music, by Greg Milner, presents the loudness war in radio and music production as a central theme. The book Mastering Audio: The Art and the Science, by Bob Katz, includes chapters about the origins of the loudness war and another suggesting methods of combating the war. These chapters are based on Katz's presentation at the 107th Audio Engineering Society Convention (1999) and subsequent Audio Engineering Society Journal publication (2000).

== Debate ==
In September 2011, Emmanuel Deruty wrote in Sound on Sound, a recording industry magazine, that the loudness war has not led to a decrease in dynamic variability in modern music, possibly because the original digitally recorded source material of modern recordings is more dynamic than analogue material. Deruty and Tardieu analyzed the loudness range (LRA) over a 45-year span of recordings and observed that the crest factor of recorded music diminished significantly between 1985 and 2010, but the LRA remained relatively constant. Deruty and Damien Tardieu criticized Sreedhar's methods in an AES paper, saying that Sreedhar had confused crest factor (peak to RMS) with dynamics in the musical sense (pianissimo to fortissimo).

This analysis was also challenged by Ian Shepherd and Bob Katz on the basis that the LRA was designed for assessing loudness variation within a track while the EBU R128 peak to loudness ratio (PLR) is a measure of the peak level of a track relative to a reference loudness level and is a more helpful metric than LRA in assessing overall perceived dynamic range. PLR measurements show a trend of reduced dynamic range throughout the 1990s.

Debate continues regarding which measurement methods are most appropriate to evaluating the loudness war.

== Examples of loud albums ==
Albums that have been criticized for their sound quality include:

Artist	Album	Release date	Reference(s)
Arctic Monkeys	Whatever People Say I Am, That's What I'm Not	23 January 2006	
Black Sabbath	13	10 June 2013	
Christina Aguilera	Back to Basics	9 August 2006	
The Cure	4:13 Dream	27 October 2008	
Duran Duran	Duran Duran (2010 remaster)	29 March 2010	
Duran Duran	Seven and the Ragged Tiger (2010 remaster)	29 March 2010	
The Flaming Lips	At War with the Mystics (Note: Won Grammy Award in 2006 for Best Engineered Album, Non-Classical)	3 April 2006	
Led Zeppelin	Mothership (Note: The 2015 remaster of this compilation does not have the same quality issues.)	12 November 2007	
Lily Allen	Alright, Still	13 July 2006	
Los Lonely Boys	Sacred	18 July 2006	
Metallica	Death Magnetic (Note: The Guitar Hero version and 2015 remaster of this album do not have the same quality issues.)	12 September 2008	
Miranda Lambert	Revolution	29 September 2009	
Oasis	(What's the Story) Morning Glory?	2 October 1995	
Paul McCartney	Memory Almost Full	4 June 2007	
Paul Simon	Surprise	9 May 2006	
Queens of the Stone Age	Songs for the Deaf	27 August 2002	
Red Hot Chili Peppers	Californication	8 June 1999	
Rush	Vapor Trails (Note: The 2013 remix & remaster of this album does not have the same quality issues.)	14 May 2002	
The Stooges	Raw Power (1997 remix & remaster)	22 April 1997	
Taylor Swift	1989	27 October 2014	

== See also ==
- Alignment level
- Audio noise measurement
- Audio system measurements
- Fader creep
- Headroom
- Loudness monitoring
- Needle drop
- Overproduction
- Pitch inflation
- Up to eleven
