= HALion =

Software instrument application

- Developer: Steinberg
- Initial release: 2001; 25 years ago
- Operating system: Windows, macOS
- Type: Software Sampler / Software Synthesizer
- Website: www.steinberg.net/vst-instruments/halion/

HALion /ˈhæ.ˌli.ə̩n/ HA-lee-ən is a software instrument application, created by German music software company Steinberg for macOS and Windows. It uses a sample-based approach to emulate the acoustic sounds of a full orchestra, such as the strings, brass, woodwind, and percussion sections, with multiple configurations for each instrument, allowing for variations in timbre. It can also use multiple forms of sound synthesis to produce other software synthesizer audio.

HALion can be used either as a standalone application, or as a VST, AU, or AAX (Avid Audio eXtension for Pro Tools) plug-in within digital audio workstation software.

== History ==
The first version of HALion was released by Steinberg in 2001. By the year 2004, it had reached version 3.

At Musikmesse 2006, Steinberg announced a specific version of the software, known as the HALion Symphonic Orchestra, which included the samples to represent a full orchestra.

On 1 April 2009, Steinberg released the version 3.5 update to HALion, which introduced 64-bit support.

In July 2009, Michael Fakesch (former member of the band Funkstörung) produced a score for the Philips commercial Carousel (which won the Film Grand Prix award at the Cannes Lions International Advertising Festival) using the HALion Symphonic Orchestra and Cubase.

In June 2010, Steinberg announced the HALion Sonic edition of the software, positioned as the successor to their previous Hypersonic 2 software instrument, including both sampling and sound synthesis functionality.

Version 4 of the main edition of HALion was announced at Musikmesse 2011, introducing sound synthesis features to expand beyond purely sample-based audio. Version 5 (and version 2 of HALion Sonic) followed in July 2013 with new instruments and effects.

Version 6 of HALion, announced at Winter NAMM Show on 19 January 2017 (alongside version 3 of HALion Sonic), introduced new features such as customization macros and user scripting (using a LUA-based scripting language).

== Editions ==
There are 3 different editions of HALion available:

- HALion Sonic SE: A free version of HALion Sonic (also included with all versions of Cubase), with a smaller sample library and reduced sound synthesis functionality.
- HALion Sonic: A version of HALion with reduced functionality. For example, it does not include custom macro and sampling features.
- HALion: The full version of HALion, including sampling and scripting functionality.
