= Vum =

VUM or Vum may refer to:

- Victoria University of Manchester, a university in Manchester, England, United Kingdom
- Vlaamse Uitgeversmaatschappij (VUM Media), a Belgian media group
- VU meter, a device displaying a representation of the signal level in audio equipment
- Variants under monitoring, a WHO definition of SARS-CoV-2 variants with genetic changes that require enhanced monitoring
