= Steinberg Nuendo =

Audio post-production system

Nuendo

- Developer: Steinberg
- Initial release: 2000; 26 years ago
- Stable release: 14.0.41 / 3 December 2025; 30 days ago
- Operating system: Microsoft Windows, macOS
- Type: Digital audio workstation
- License: Proprietary
- Website: www.steinberg.net/nuendo/

Nuendo is a digital audio workstation (DAW) developed by Steinberg for music recording, arranging, editing, and post-production. The package is aimed at audio and video post-production market segments (marketed as a 'Premium Media Production System', in contrast to Steinberg's other DAW software, Cubase, which is marketed as an 'Advanced Music Production System'), but also contains optional modules that can be used for multiple multimedia creation and audio sequencing.

== History ==
The first version of Nuendo was released by Steinberg in the year 2000. Version 2 followed in 2003, introducing multiple aspects of functionality previously found in the SX version of Steinberg's other DAW, Cubase, at the time.

Version 3 of Nuendo was released in 2005, shortly after the sale of Steinberg to the Japanese multinational corporation and conglomerate Yamaha. It was the first version of the software to support the AAF file format.

Version 4 (September 2007) introduced a new automation system and new VST3 format plug-ins; version 5 (July 2010) added new tools for ADR and sound design; and version 6 (September 2013) included new loudness metering and a new mixing console.

Nuendo version 7 was first previewed at the Game Developers Conference in March 2015, then released in June 2015. It introduced a feature known as Game Audio Connect, allowing for direct transfer of audio assets using Audiokinetic's Wwise middleware.

Version 8 of Nuendo was released in June 2017, featuring version 2 of the Game Audio Connect functionality, sound randomization, and new offline processing features.

Version 10 had been announced and previewed at GDC 2019 in San Francisco on 20–22 March 2019, then released on 24 April 2019

== See also ==
- Steinberg Cubase
- Digital audio workstation
- Steinberg
