= TonePort =

TonePort is a line of USB audio interfaces from Line 6 which extended the earlier GuitarPort interface. The TonePort line was eventually replaced, except for the UX8 model, by the POD Studio line. The TonePort line included the following models:

- GX - features: 1/4" instrument input, 1/8" line out/phones, USB output.
- UX1 - features: 1/4" instrument input, XLR microphone input, 1/4" (left and right) line inputs, 1/4" monitor input, 1/4" (left and right) analog outputs, USB output.
- UX2 - features: 1/4" instrument input, 1/4" padded (-10db) instrument input, 2 XLR microphone inputs, 1/4" (left and right) line inputs, 1/4" monitor input, 1/4" (left and right) analog outputs, S/PDIF output, two VU meters, USB output.
- KB37 - same audio interface features as the UX2, plus a 37-note velocity sensitive MIDI keyboard controller.
- UX8 - 8 XLR inputs, 8¼" line inputs, two 1/4-inch front panel instrument inputs, eight 1/4" outputs, two 1/4" stereo headphone jacks, stereo RCA S/PDIF input and output, two VU meters, USB output

All TonePort models included GearBox, a software package for creating and managing amplifier, speaker cabinet, effect, and microphone pre-amp models. All versions except the GX and the UX8 shipped with Ableton Live Lite recording software and Sonoma Wire Works RiffWorks Line6 Edition recording software.

In October 2008, Line6 dropped the TonePort name, except for the KB37 and UX8 models, and renamed the GX, UX1, and UX2 models "POD Studio." In January 2009, the KB37 model was also rebranded, the UX8 being the only model still using the TonePort brand.

Line6 introduced a new software package for the POD Studio line, called POD Farm, which replicates most of the function of GearBox but with a different user interface (both GearBox and POD Farm work with all TonePort and POD Studio models).
