= Karl Steinberg =

German businessman

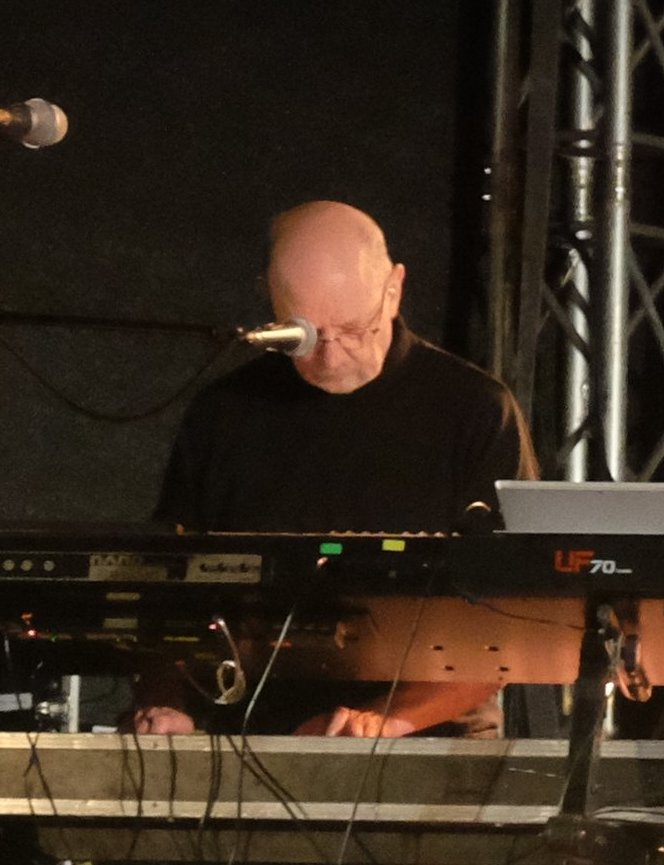
Steinberg in 2017

Karl "Charlie" Steinberg (born 15 April 1952) is a German businessman best known for being the co-founder of Steinberg Media Technologies in 1983 with Manfred Rürup. Their tools helped to make digital audio editing popular, most notably through the Cubase program. He and Rürup also co-founded the now-discontinued online service digitalmusician.net.

Steinberg is also a founding member of the Fun and Mercy charity. He lives in Hamburg with his wife and two children.

== Musician ==
In 1978, Charlie Steinberg (bass), Freddy Homann (guitar and vocals) and Hölmlölm Vieth (guitar) of the band Wotan, founded the band Törner Stier Crew together with the musicians Hans-Martin Stier (vocals), Walter Stoever (bass) and Olaf Schräder (drums). Steinberg became the keyboarder of the new band. In 1979 the band won the 1st prize of the Deutsche Phono-Akademie, the forerunner of the Echo Music Prize. An appearance on WDR Rockpalast and many live performances followed in 1980. The Törner Stier Crew released a total of three studio albums until 1983.

An English solo album of Steinberg recorded in the mid-eighties remains unpublished.

Since 2007 Karl Steinberg has played as a keyboarder with the rock quintet Stier, together with two other members of the Törner Stier Crew. After various live appearances his first EP album produced by Siggi Bemm was released in 2009.

== Audio engineer ==
As an audio engineer and co-producer, Karl Steinberg mixed the albums of various bands of the Neuen Deutschen Welle.

At the Wilster studio in 1984, Steinberg recorded Inga Rumpf's Liebe. Leiden. Leben.. During this time, he also worked on projects with Mau Mau, Manfred Rürup, Modern and Udo Dahmen. In 1982 Steinberg worked with Frl. Menke in 1982 in the Studio Maschen and in the Loft Studios Brunwey together with Achim Reichel and Boyzone.

== Software developer ==
Steinberg Research GmbH's first product, a Multitrack Recorder for the Commodore C64, was one of the first MIDI-Sequencers available on the market in 1983. The MIDI protocol was presented to the public in the same year. The MIDI interfaces distributed with the Multitrack Recorder were self-soldered at the beginning. After the Pro 16 for the C-64 and the Pro 24 for the Atari ST, the music software Cubase appeared in 1989. In 1996, Steinberg released the Virtual Studio Technology (VST). Today, VST is the most widely used plug-in standard in the audio sector.

Steinberg Media Technologies GmbH has been owned by Yamaha Corporation since 2004.

With the digital musician recorder from digitalmusician.net Karl Steinberg and Manfred Rürup developed a free audio recorder that allows you to record polyphonic music in real time via an internet connection. The service was closed down on 30 June 2018.

== Awards ==
- MIPA Lifetime Achievement Award 2009
- Nominated for Grammy Lifetime Achievement Award 2008
