= Loudness monitoring =

Loudness monitoring of programme audio levels

Loudness monitoring of programme levels is needed in radio and television broadcasting, as well as in audio post production. Traditional methods of measuring signal levels, such as the peak programme meter and VU meter, do not give a subjectively valid measure of loudness that many would argue is needed to optimise the listening experience when changing channels or swapping disks.

The need for proper loudness monitoring is apparent in the loudness war that is now found everywhere in the audio field, and the extreme compression that is now applied to programme levels.

== Loudness meters ==
Meters have been introduced that aim to measure the human perceived loudness by taking account of the equal-loudness contours and other factors, such as audio spectrum, duration, compression and intensity. One such device was developed by CBS Laboratories in the 1980s. Complaints to broadcasters about the intrusive level of interstitial programs (advertisements, commercials) have resulted in projects to develop such meters. Based on loudness metering, many manufacturers have developed real-time audio processors that adjust the audio signal to match a specified target loudness level that preserves volume consistency at home listeners.

== EBU Mode meters ==
In August 2010, the European Broadcasting Union published a new metering specification EBU Tech 3341, which builds on ITU-R BS.1770. To make sure meters from different manufacturers provide the same reading in LUFS units, EBU Tech 3341 specifies the EBU Mode, which includes a Momentary (400 ms), Short term (3 s) and Integrated (from start to stop) meters and a set of audio signals to test the meters.

== See also ==
- Audio normalization
