= Levelator =

Audio editing software

The Levelator
- Developer: The Conversations Network
- Stable release: 2.1.1
- Operating system: Windows, Mac, Linux
- Type: Audio Editing Software
- License: Freeware
- Website: Levelator Homepage

The Levelator is a software application that makes adjustments to audio signals.

== Publication ==
The Levelator was a free application distributed by The Conversations Network and developed by Bruce and Malcolm Sharpe, Norman Lorrain and Doug Kaye. Originally distributed by GigaVox Media, Inc (a for-profit company), the rights were transferred to The Conversations Network (a California 501(c)(3)) in 2008. The underlying code was originally used only for The Conversations Network's own podcasts but was subsequently released to the public, free for commercial and non-commercial use. It was unveiled to the public at the first Podcast and New Media Expo in 2005. The adjustments and drag-and-drop workflow of the Levelator make it a valuable tool for professional and non-professional broadcasters and podcasters.

As of the end of 2012, the Levelator is no longer supported or being updated by The Conversations Network. Conversations Network ceased daily operations at the end of 2012.

When OS X 10.11 (El Capitan) was released, the Levelator was found to be incompatible. The original development team, Bruce Sharpe, Norman Lorrain and Doug Kaye collaborated in November 2015 to develop an OS X-only compatible release 2.1.2.

A version of The Levelator was revived and released for free by The Conversations Network in the Mac App Store. As of July 1, 2026, the app page says "Requires macOS 12.0 or later."

== Functioning ==
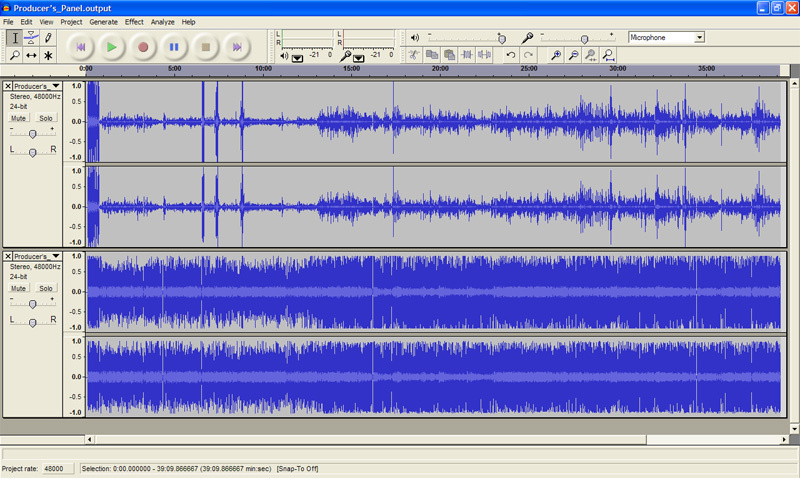
Screenshot of before and after renderings of an audio sample adjusted by the Levelator as seen in Audacity

The Levelator adjusts the audio levels within an audio segment by combining traditional discrete compression, normalization and limiting processing. By taking a global view of the data in various time segments (both long and short), the Levelator automatically balances various audio levels, such as multiple microphone levels in an interview or panel discussion, or segments combined from multiple sessions that were recorded at different levels. The Levelator can read and process PCM audio files of many sample rates and resolutions.

The Levelator reads the original audio file and creates a new audio file with balanced levels and a uniform overall volume level that is then saved in the same format as the original, but with ".output " added to the file name. Only PCM audio source files are supported (most major file formats, including WAV and AIFF). Video and lossy compressed audio are not supported, encouraging use of The Levelator at the correct point in the production chain - i.e. before lossy encoding to the delivery format such as MP3.
