= Fader creep =

Fader creep is a colloquial term used in audio recording to describe a tendency for sound engineers to raise the gain of individual channels on a mixing console, rather than lowering others, to achieve a desired change or fix perceived problems in the mix. For example, an engineer might compensate for a particularly loud drum track by raising the volumes of the voice, the guitar, and the piano to the point where all of the individual signals are competing for headroom. Fader creep may also occur in audio mixing for live concerts.

Fader creep can be a particular problem in audio mixing sessions for multi-track recordings, where individual sounds held on separate audio tracks, or delivered by outboard MIDI or computer audio equipment are combined into the final stereo presentation of the recording. The faders (potentiometers that operate by sliding up or down) or volume controls (rotary potentiometers) on the mixing board or audio processor gradually "creep" toward the maximum volume setting, which reduces the ability to manipulate the relative volumes between channels. This can also result in clipping or distortion of the master mix, which is when the overall volume of sound is too great for the equipment or recording medium intended to hold it.

Common causes of fader creep include ear fatigue, or the diminishing of the ability for the human ear to hear clearly after prolonged exposure to loud sounds, which can reduce the ability of the sound engineer to hear the individual components of the mix accurately. It may also occur if the master fader or monitor's levels are too low and an engineer attempts to address this by setting individual faders higher.

== See also ==
- Loudness war
