= Mary Florentine =

- Education: Northeastern University, Massachusetts Institute of Technology
- Known for: Softness Imperception, Binaural Loudness Summation
- Awards: Distinguished Researcher Award (1985), Excellence-in-Teaching Award (1986), Matthews Distinguished Professor (1995)
- Scientific career
- Fields: psychoacoustics, loudness, hearing, audiology

Mary Florentine is a Matthews Distinguished Professor at Northeastern University specialising in psychoacoustics with interests in models of hearing (normal and impaired), non-native speech comprehension in background noise, cross-cultural attitudes towards noise, and hearing loss prevention. Her primary collaborator is Søren Buus.

== Biography ==
=== Career ===
Florentine completed her undergraduate degree in experimental psychology at Northeastern University in 1973. She continued her graduate study at Northeastern University, earning a master's degree in experimental psychology and auditory perception in 1975. After some time spent studying pre-doctoral electronic engineering at the Technical University of Munich in Germany and at the Audiology and ENT Department at Copenhagen University Hospital in Denmark, she completed her PhD at Northeastern University in 1978. She then went on to work as a post-doctoral research fellow at Massachusetts Institute of Technology (MIT) in Cambridge, Massachusetts. Since then, she has also worked as a visiting scientist at the National Centre for Scientific Research in Marseille, France; the Osaka University in Toyonaka, Japan; and, on several occasions, at the acoustics laboratory at the Danish Technical University.

In 1980 she returned to Northeastern University as the director of the Communication Research Laboratory and in 1986 commenced a long-term collaboration with her husband, Søren Buus, at the Hearing Research Laboratory until he died in 2004. At Northeastern University, Florentine is an effective and popular teacher, securing the Excellence-in-Teaching Award only a few years after starting her faculty position. Her academic work has also appealed to more general audiences and she has been interviewed for TIME, Redbook and National Public Radio’s All Things Considered. Florentine co-edited and (co-)wrote a few chapters in the recently published textbook Loudness (Springer Handbook of Auditory Research), which explains some conceptual thinking relating to loudness, issues of loudness study and measurement, hearing and hearing loss models, and physiological effects of loud sounds.

=== Personal ===
Florentine was born in Nutley, New Jersey, and was the eldest in a family with five children. She moved to Boston, Massachusetts, to take up her undergraduate study, which was fully supported by a merit grant, and has lived there ever since, except for brief periods of study and work abroad. While abroad, she met her husband Søren Buus, who also became her primary collaborator, and they married in 1980. They have one daughter, born in 1987.

== Notable work ==
=== Softness Imperception ===
Softness Imperception (SI) is a term coined by Florentine and colleagues to describe the inability to hear quiet sounds that are audible to normal listeners. This phenomenon is particularly common among people with cochlear hearing loss. When a person with SI hears a sound at threshold, it sounds louder than a sound at threshold would do for a normal listener. Therefore, people with hearing loss may find softer sounds more intrusive when fitted with hearing aids that simply amplify all soft sounds to threshold.

=== Binaural Loudness Summation ===
Florentine's most recent work has been on binaural loudness summation, and her research with Michael J. Epstein has indicated that, in more ecologically valid experiments, the binaural loudness summation ratio is found to be significantly lower than previously thought.
