= Loudness =

Subjective perception of sound pressure

The horizontal axis shows frequency in Hertz

In acoustics, loudness is the subjective perception of sound pressure. More formally, it is defined as the "attribute of auditory sensation in terms of which sounds can be ordered on a scale extending from quiet to loud". The relation of physical attributes of sound to perceived loudness includes physical, physiological and psychological components. The study of apparent loudness is included in the topic of psychoacoustics and employs methods of psychophysics.

In different industries, loudness may have different meanings and different measurement standards. Some definitions, such as ITU-R BS.1770 refer to the relative loudness of different segments of electronically reproduced sounds, such as for broadcasting and cinema. Others, such as ISO 532A (Stevens loudness, measured in sones), ISO 532B (Zwicker loudness), DIN 45631 and ASA/ANSI S3.4, have a more general scope and are often used to characterize the loudness of environmental noise. More modern standards, such as Nordtest ACOU112 and ISO/AWI 532-3 (in progress), take into account other components of loudness, such as onset rate, time variation and spectral masking.

Loudness, a subjective measure, is often confused with physical measures of sound strength such as sound pressure, sound pressure level (in decibels), sound intensity or sound power. Weighting filters such as A-weighting and LKFS attempt to compensate measurements to correspond to loudness as perceived by the typical human.

== Explanation ==
The perception of loudness is related to sound pressure level (SPL), frequency content and duration of a sound. The relationship between SPL and loudness of a single tone can be approximated by Stevens's power law in which SPL has an exponent of 0.67. (Note: The relationship between loudness and energy intensity of sound can therefore be approximated by a power function with an exponent of 0.3.) A more precise model known as the inflected exponential function, indicates that loudness increases with a higher exponent at low and high levels and with a lower exponent at moderate levels.

The sensitivity of the human ear changes as a function of frequency, as shown in the equal-loudness graph. Each line on this graph shows the SPL required for frequencies to be perceived as equally loud, and different curves pertain to different sound pressure levels. It also shows that humans with normal hearing are most sensitive to sounds around 2–4 kHz, with sensitivity declining to either side of this region. A complete model of the perception of loudness will include the integration of SPL by frequency.

Historically, loudness was measured using an ear-balancing method with an audiometer in which the amplitude of a sine wave was adjusted by the user to equal the perceived loudness of the sound being evaluated. Contemporary standards for measurement of loudness are based on the summation of energy in critical bands.

== Hearing loss ==
When sensorineural hearing loss (damage to the cochlea or in the brain) is present, the perception of loudness is altered. Sounds at low levels (often perceived by those without hearing loss as relatively quiet) are no longer audible to the hearing impaired, but sounds at high levels often are perceived as having the same loudness as they would for an unimpaired listener. This phenomenon can be explained by two theories, called loudness recruitment and softness imperception.

Loudness recruitment posits that loudness grows more rapidly for certain listeners than for normal listeners with changes in level. This theory has been accepted as the classical explanation.

Softness imperception, a term coined by Mary Florentine around 2002, proposes that some listeners with sensorineural hearing loss may exhibit a normal rate of loudness growth, but instead have an elevated loudness at their threshold. That is, the softest sound that is audible to these listeners is louder than the softest sound audible to normal listeners.

== Compensation ==
The loudness control associated with a loudness compensation feature on some consumer stereos alters the frequency response curve to correspond roughly with the equal loudness characteristic of the ear. Loudness compensation is intended to make the recorded music sound more natural when played at a lower levels by boosting low frequencies, to which the ear is less sensitive at lower sound pressure levels.

== Normalization ==
Loudness normalization is a specific type of audio normalization that equalizes perceived level such that, for instance, commercials do not sound louder than television programs. Loudness normalization schemes exist for a number of audio applications.

=== Broadcast ===
- Commercial Advertisement Loudness Mitigation Act
- EBU R 128

=== Movie and home theaters ===
- Dialnorm

=== Music playback ===
- Sound Check in iTunes
- ReplayGain
- Normalization systems built into streaming services such as Spotify and YouTube.

== Measurement ==
Historically sone (loudness N) and phon (loudness level L_{N}) units have been used to measure loudness.

A-weighting follows human sensitivity to sound and describes relative perceived loudness for at quiet to moderate speech levels, around 40 phons.

Relative loudness monitoring in production is measured in accordance with ITU-R BS.1770 in units of LKFS. Work began on ITU-R BS.1770 in 2001 after 0 dBFS+ level distortion in converters and lossy codecs had become evident; and the original Leq(RLB) loudness metric was proposed by Gilbert Soulodre in 2003. Based on data from subjective listening tests, Leq(RLB) compared favorably to numerous other algorithms. CBC, Dolby and TC Electronic and numerous broadcasters contributed to the listening tests. Loudness levels measured according to the Leq(RLB) specified in ITU-R BS.1770 are reported in LKFS units.

The ITU-R BS.1770 measurement system was improved for multi-channel applications (monaural to 5.1 surround sound). To improve consistency across program material genres, a relative measurement gate was added. This work was carried out in 2008 by the EBU. The improvements were brought back into BS.1770-2. ITU subsequently updated the true-peak metric (BS.1770-3) and added provision for even more audio channels, for instance 22.2 surround sound (BS.1770-4).

== See also ==
- Dynamics (music)
- Loudness war
- Sending loudness rating
- Standard siren, loudness measurement in astronomy
