= Steinberg =

German music software and hardware company

Steinberg Media Technologies GmbH
- Type: Subsidiary
- Industry: Software Development
- Genre: Music technology
- Founded: 1984; 42 years ago
- Founder: Karl Steinberg; Manfred Rürup
- Headquarters: Hamburg, Germany
- Key people: Managing Directors: Clyde Sendke, Yoshiyuki Tsugawa, Marco Papini
- Products: Cubase, Nuendo, WaveLab, HALion, Dorico, SpectraLayers
- Parent: Yamaha Corporation
- Website: steinberg.net

Steinberg Media Technologies GmbH (trading as Steinberg; pronounced [ˈʃtaɪnbɛʁk]) is a German musical software and hardware company based in Hamburg. It develops software for writing, recording, arranging and editing music, most notably Cubase, Nuendo, and Dorico. It also designs audio and MIDI hardware interfaces, controllers, and iOS/Android music apps including Cubasis. Steinberg created several industry standard music technologies including the Virtual Studio Technology (VST) format for plug-ins and the ASIO (Audio Stream Input/Output) protocol. Steinberg has been a wholly owned subsidiary of Yamaha since 2005.

== History ==
The company was founded in 1984 by Karl Steinberg, Manfred Rürup and Rürups wife Nicole, in Rürups apartment in Hamburg. Karl Steinberg was a musician and audio engineer and Manfred Rürup was a musician playing at the time with Inga Rumpf. The developers got acquainted with the recently released MIDI specification in 1982, as Rürup was working part time in the keyboard shop Amptown Hamburg. The very first product from Steinberg was MIDI Multitrack Sequencer created in 1984, and this was used in tandem with their own-designed electronic MIDI interface Steinberg Research Interface for the Commodore 64. In total, around 50 such packages were sold.

In 1985 they created Pro-16, another MIDI sequencing application for the Commodore 64. Both programs were written more or less by Karl Steinberg himself. Pro-16 could use the older Steinberg Research Interface but a new electronic MIDI interface for the Commodore 64 called CARD 32 was also developed, featuring one MIDI in, three MIDI out, tape sync, and an EPROM version of Pro-16 that would start immediately on power-on. The name Pro-16 came from the ambition to be similar to a 16-channel tape recorder, but for MIDI data.

In 1985 Steinberg hired Werner Kracht who throughout 1986 developed Pro-24 for the Atari ST platform pretty much on his own as Steinberg was busy creating different OEM products based on Pro-16. Again the program mimicked a tape recorder, but now a tape recorder with 24 channels. The ST had built-in MIDI ports which helped to quickly increase interest in the new technology across the music world.

In 1989, Steinberg released Cubase for Atari, and versions for the Mac and Windows platforms would follow soon afterwards. Cubase was visualized by Wolfgang Kundrus, and implemented by a team including Werner Kracht, Stefan Scheffler, Michael Michaelis and Karl Steinberg who mainly contributed the run-time system M-ROS. It became a very popular MIDI sequencer, used in studios around the globe.

Steinberg Media Technologies AG had a revenue of 25 million DM in 1999. It had 180 employees in 2000. A planned entry on the Neuer Markt (New Market, NEMAX50) of the Deutsche Börse failed. The company had a revenue of 20 million Euros in 2001 and 130 employees in 2002.

In 2003, Steinberg was acquired by Pinnacle Systems and shortly after that, by Yamaha in 2004. With its new mother company Yamaha, Steinberg expanded design and production of its own hardware, and since 2008, it has created a range of audio and MIDI interface hardware including the UR, MR816, CC and CI series.

In 2012, Steinberg launched its first iOS sequencer, Cubasis, which has seen regular updates since then. The Steinberg satellite office in London was also opened in 2012.

Steinberg has won a number of industry awards including several MIPA awards, and accolades for Cubasis and its CMC controllers amongst others.

=== Dorico team acquisition ===
In 2012, Steinberg acquired the former development team behind Sibelius, following the closure of Avid's London office in July, to begin development on a new professional scoring software named Dorico. It was released on 19 October 2016.

== Product history ==
Cubase was released in 1989, initially as a MIDI sequencer. Digital audio recording followed in 1992 with Cubase Audio, followed by VST support in 1996, which made it possible for third-party software programmers to create and sell audio plug-ins, and eventually virtual instruments for Cubase. Steinberg bundled its own VST instruments and effects with Cubase, as well as continuing to develop standalone software instruments. Atari support eventually ended, and Cubase became a Mac and Windows DAW (digital audio workstation), with feature parity across both platforms.

The WaveLab audio editing and mastering suite followed in 1995 for Windows, and the VST and ASIO protocols – open technologies that could be used by any manufacturer – were first released in 1997. WaveLab would come to the Mac in 2010.

In 2000, the company released Nuendo, a new DAW clearly targeted at the broadcast and media industries. 2001 saw the release of HALion, a dedicated software sampler. A complete rewrite of Cubase in 2002 was necessary due to its legacy code which was no longer maintainable, leading to a name change to Cubase SX, ditching older technology and using the audio engine from Nuendo. Since this time, Cubase and Nuendo have shared many core technologies. Cubase currently comes in three versions – Elements, Artist and Pro.

Steinberg was one of the first DAW manufacturers who started using automatic delay compensation for synchronization of different channels of the mixer which may have different latency.

With the growing popularity of mobile devices, Steinberg develops apps for iOS including Cubasis, a fully featured DAW for iPad with plug-ins, full audio and MIDI recording and editing and many other professional features. It also creates standalone apps, including the Nanologue synth and LoopMash. In 2016, Steinberg released Dorico, a professional music notation and scoring suite.

=== Steinberg VST ===
As part of the development of its flagship, the sequencer Cubase, Steinberg defined the VST interface (Virtual Studio Technology) in 1996, by means of which external programs can be integrated as virtual instruments playable via MIDI. VST simulates a real-time studio environment with EQs, effects, mixing and automation and has become a quasi-standard supported by many other audio editing programs.

The latest version is VST 3. The VST 3 is a general rework of the long-serving VST plug-in interface. It is not compatible with the older VST versions, but it includes some new features and possibilities.

Initially developed for Macintosh only, Steinberg Cubase VST for the PC followed a year later and established VST and the Audio Stream Input/Output Protocol (ASIO) as open standards that enabled third parties to develop plug-ins and audio hardware. ASIO ensures that the delay caused by the audio hardware during sound output is kept to a minimum to enable hardware manufacturers to provide specialized drivers. ASIO has established itself as the standard for audio drivers.

== Products ==
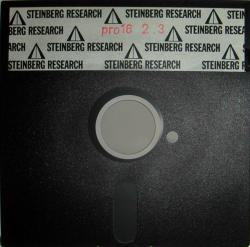
Steinberg's first product, Steinberg Pro 16, was sold on floppy disks. This is version 2.3

=== Current products ===
==== Music software ====
- Cubase
- Dorico
- Nuendo
- WaveLab
- SpectraLayers
- Sequel
- Cubasis (for iOS and Android)

==== VST instruments ====
- HALion (SE/Sonic) – virtual sampling and sound design system
- HALion Symphonic Orchestra
- Groove Agent – electronic and acoustic drums
- The Grand – virtual Piano
- Padshop – granular synthesizer
- Retrologue – analog synthesizer
- Dark Planet – dark sounds for cinematic and electronic music
- Hypnotic Dance – synth-based dance sounds
- Triebwerk – Sounds for Elektro, Techno and House
- Iconica – Orchester Library, recorded at Funkhaus Berlin

==== Hardware ====
- Steinberg AXR4 – 28x24 Thunderbolt 2 Audio Interface with 32-Bit Integer Recording and RND SILK
- Steinberg UR824 – 24x24 USB 2.0 audio interface with 8x D-PREs, 24-bit/192 kHz, on board DSP, zero latency monitoring, advanced integration. Their top-of-the-line USB audio interface
- Steinberg CC121 – Advanced Integration Controller
- Steinberg CI2 – Advanced Integration Controller

Steinberg Houston - Controller with motorised faders

- Steinberg MR816 CSX – Advanced Integration DSP Studio
- Steinberg MR816 X – Advanced Integration DSP Studio
- Steinberg UR44 – 6x4 USB 2.0 audio interface with 4x D-PREs, 24-bit/192 kHz support & MIDI I/O
- Steinberg UR22mkII – 2x2 USB 2.0 audio interface with 2x D-PREs, 24-bit/192 kHz support & MIDI I/O
- Steinberg UR12 – 2x2 USB 2.0 audio interface with 1x D-PREs, 24-bit/192 kHz support
- Steinberg Key (License Control Device for Steinberg Software - Dongle)
- eLicenser (License Control Management for Steinberg Software - Dongle)

=== Past products ===
==== Music software ====
- Pro 16 (for Commodore 64)
- Trackstar (for Commodore 64)
- Pro 24 (for Atari ST, Amiga)
- The Ear (for Atari ST)
- Twelve (for Atari ST)
- Tango (for Atari ST)
- MusiCal (for Atari ST)
- Cubeat (for Atari ST)
- Cubase Lite (for Atari ST/Mac/PC)
- SoundWorks series (for Atari ST) – Sample editors for the Akai S900, Ensoniq Mirage, E-mu Emax and Sequential Prophet 2000
- SynthWorks series (for Atari ST) – Patch editor/librarians for the Yamaha DX7, DX7II, TX7 and TX81z, Roland D50, other Roland D-series (D20, D10, D110, D5) and MT32 and Ensoniq ESQ-1
- Cubase SX
- Cubase VST
- Avalon – sample editor for Atari
- V-Stack
- ReCycle – Windows/Mac sample editor

==== VST instruments ====
- Plex
- D'cota
- Hypersonic
- X-phraze
- Model-E
- Virtual Guitarist
- Virtual Bassist

==== Hardware ====
- MIDEX-8 – USB MIDI interface
- MIDEX-3 – USB MIDI interface
- MIDEX+ – Atari MIDI interface
- Steinberg Amiga MIDI interface
- Steinberg Media Interface 4 (MI4) – USB MIDI interface
- Avalon 16 DA Converter – AD Converter for Atari
- SMP-24 – SMPTE/MIDI processor
- Timelock – SMPTE processor
- Topaz – Computer controlled recorder

== Protocols ==
Steinberg have introduced several industry-standard software protocols. These include:

- ASIO (a low-latency communication protocol between software and sound cards)
- VST (a protocol allowing third-party audio plugins and virtual instruments)
- LTB (providing accurate timing for its now-discontinued MIDI interfaces)
- VSL (an audio/MIDI network protocol which allows the connection and synchronisation of multiple computers running Steinberg software)

Steinberg's notable packages include the sequencers Cubase and Nuendo, as well as WaveLab (a digital audio editor) and numerous VST plugins.
