= VU meter =

Audio signal level measurement device

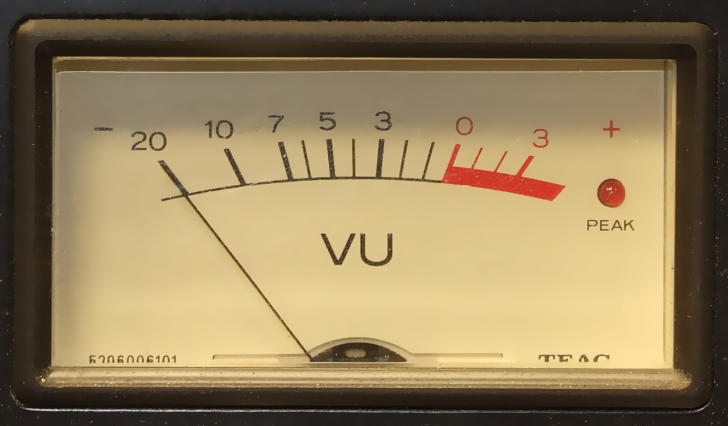
An analog VU meter with peak LED

A volume unit (VU) meter or standard volume indicator (SVI) is a device displaying a representation of the audio signal level in audio equipment.

Consumer audio equipment often features VU meters, both for utility purposes (e.g., in recording equipment) and for aesthetics (in playback devices).

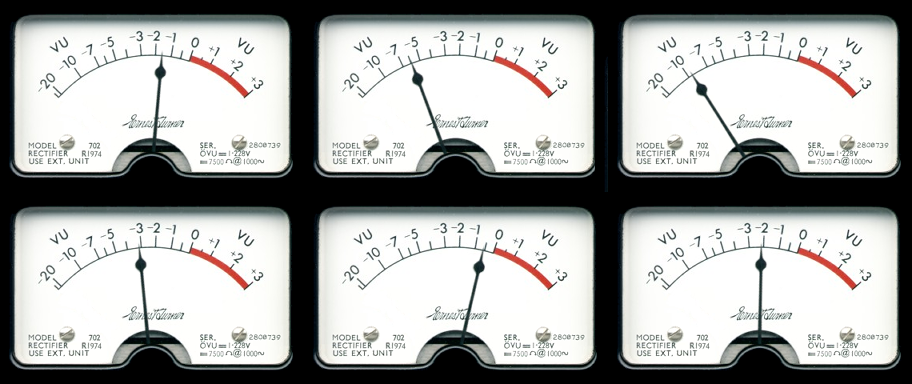
Surround audio VU meter graphic

The original design was proposed in the 1940 IRE paper, A New Standard Volume Indicator and Reference Level, written by experts from CBS, NBC, and Bell Telephone Laboratories. The Acoustical Society of America then standardized it in 1942 (ANSI C16.5-1942) for use in telephone installation and radio broadcast stations.

The original VU meter is a passive electromechanical device, namely a 200 μA DC d'Arsonval movement ammeter fed from a full-wave copper-oxide rectifier mounted within the meter case. The mass of the needle causes a relatively slow response, which in effect integrates or smooths the signal, with a rise time of 300 ms. This has the effect of averaging out peaks and lows of short duration, and reflects the perceived loudness of the material more closely than the more modern and initially more expensive PPMs. For this reason, many audio practitioners prefer the VU meter to its alternatives, though the meter indication does not reflect some of the key features of the signal, most notably its peak level, which in many cases, must not pass a defined limit.

0 VU is equal to +4 dBu, or 1.228 volts RMS, a power of about 2.5 milliwatts when applied across a 600-ohm load. 0 VU is often referred to as "0 dB". The meter was designed not to measure the signal, but to let users aim the signal level to a target level of 0 VU (sometimes labelled 100%). Therefore, it doesn't matter that the device is non-linear and imprecise for low levels. In effect, the scale ranges from −20 VU to +3 VU, with −3 VU right in the middle (half the power of 0 VU). Purely electronic devices may emulate the response of the needle; they are VU meters inasmuch as they respect the standard.

In the broadcast industry, loudness monitoring was standardized, in 2009 in the United States by the ATSC A/85, in 2010 in Europe by the EBU R 128, in 2011 in Japan by the TR-B32, and in 2010 in Australia by the OP-59.

== Lead ==
The original designers of the VU meter were tasked with finding a way to measure complex audio signals with a simple technology. Since a VU meter is a mechanical device, it can never reflect the instantaneous signal peaks of complex audio signals. The designers of the VU meter therefore took a different approach. They created a meter that did not measure peaks, but simply inferred them. A real VU meter has a very specific "ballistic characteristic", meaning that it responds to changing audio signals at a very precise speed, rising from no signal to 99% of "0 VU" when a 1 kHz sine wave tone is applied for 300 milliseconds.

When using a VU meter, the audio system is calibrated with a sine wave tone at a "reference level" for the system. At the reference level, the VU meter shows "0" for a sine-wave tone, but the engineer must know that, with music or speech, they must always infer that peak levels are between 6 dB and 10 dB higher than the reference level. The usefulness of the VU meter comes from the fact that for most types of audio sources the system engineer can rely on these peaks being within this range and to design the audio system with confidence. Good engineering practice is to always build in a little extra "headroom", as it is called, to cover the strange conditions where an audio signal might exceed normal peak levels or the equipment operator fails to adjust the levels correctly. Typically the levels considered when designing systems using a VU meter are:

- Reference level (typically +4 dBu, valid with tones only);
- Standard output level (10 dB above reference, typical peak levels);
- Clip level (6 dB above standard output level, "headroom" to allow for unusual conditions)

== Standard characteristics ==
The behaviour of VU meters is defined in ANSI C16.5-1942, British Standard BS 6840, and IEC 60268-17.

=== Reference level ===
VU defined:

"The reading of the volume indicator shall be 0 VU when it is connected to an AC voltage equal to 1.228 Volts RMS across a 600 ohm resistance (equal to +4 [dBu]) at 1000 cycles per second."

Note: The reference above is generally true now and was always true in the recording industry. However in some North American broadcast installations up until late in the 20th century, the Reference level ("0VU") was +8dBm at large studio installations and some used 150 ohm impedance throughout the studio (CFRB Toronto and CFPL London Canada). This was yet another "standard" established in the early years of audio and the VU meter was altered by changing the series resistors to adjust its sensitivity. This had no effect on the ballistics.

=== Rise time ===
The response of a VU meter (black line) compared to instantaneous input level (grey area) of a drum beat. Level is in dB and time is in seconds.

The rise time, defined as the time it takes for the needle to reach 99% of the distance to 0 VU when the VU-meter is subjected to a signal that steps from 0 to a level that reads 0 VU, is 300 ms.

The overshoot must be within 1 to 1.5%.

The fall time is the same as the rise time, 300 ms.

=== Frequency response ===
The level specification is defined at 1000 Hz. The reading should not change by more than 0.2 dB from 35 Hz to 10 kHz or more than 0.5 dB between 25 Hz and 16 kHz from the reading at 1000 Hz .

Note that the specification mentions only sinusoidal waveforms. Because of the electromechanical principle of the meter, the needle actually deviates instantaneously approximately proportionally to the ''average'' of part of the signal. This part is the part with more than approximately 0.4 V because of the two copper-oxide rectifiers always in series, whose transfer function curve has a knee around 0.2 V. Signals generally do not have a sinusoidal waveform by far, even if they all fall within the VU-meter bandpass. The reading is the average of the voltage, and is not an indication of the power of the signal, which is proportional to the average of the voltage squared, or the root-mean-square (RMS) value. As a conventional VU reading, however, it served its purpose as an indication:

a) Of the overall level and dynamics of the signal.

b) Of the proximity to the maximum admitted level for the operators of recording and broadcasting equipment. Maintenance staff could also use it as a measurement apparatus, to check for losses in transmissions and level alignment, provided that they used exclusively sine waves as test signals.

=== Impedance ===
The VU meter and its attenuator should present a 7 500-ohm impedance to the circuit it is applied to, measured with a sinusoid signal that sets the indicator to 0 dB.

== History ==
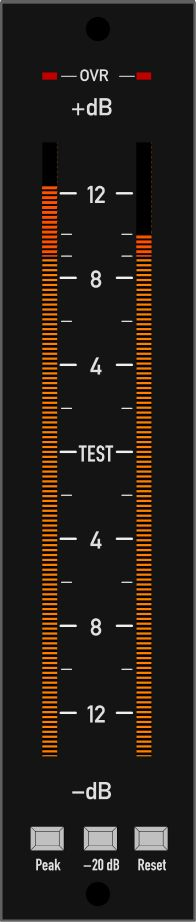
Neon bar graph VU meter

The VU-meter was originally developed in 1939 by the combined effort of Bell Labs and broadcasters CBS and NBC. In the 1970s–80s, neon-filled, planar dual displays with up to 201 segments per stereo channel were popular among broadcasters as fast bar graph VU meters.

== Other level meters ==
The consumer audio industry often uses volume indicators that do not comply with any standard.

BBC sound engineers would refer to the VU meter as the "Virtually Useless" meter, preferring the PPM.

Academic research has shown that an SVI or VU meter behaves differently from the average value and RMS meters. The ballistics shown by this instrument, in response to signals with a large crest factor, position its readings halfway between both. For example, an increment of 3 dB in the crest factor of an audio signal gives approximately a fall of −3 dB in a RMS meter, −6 dB in an average meter, and −4 dB in a VU meter.

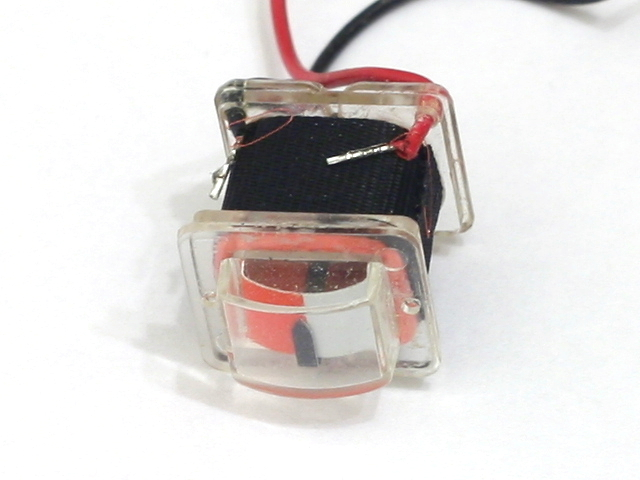
Another miniature electromagnetic meter

== See also ==
- Audio equipment
- Crest factor
- Decibel
- Loudness monitoring
- Mixing console
- Noise pollution
- Nominal level
- Peak meter
- Peak programme meter
