= Peak programme meter =

Quasi-peak audio level meter originally developed in the 1930s

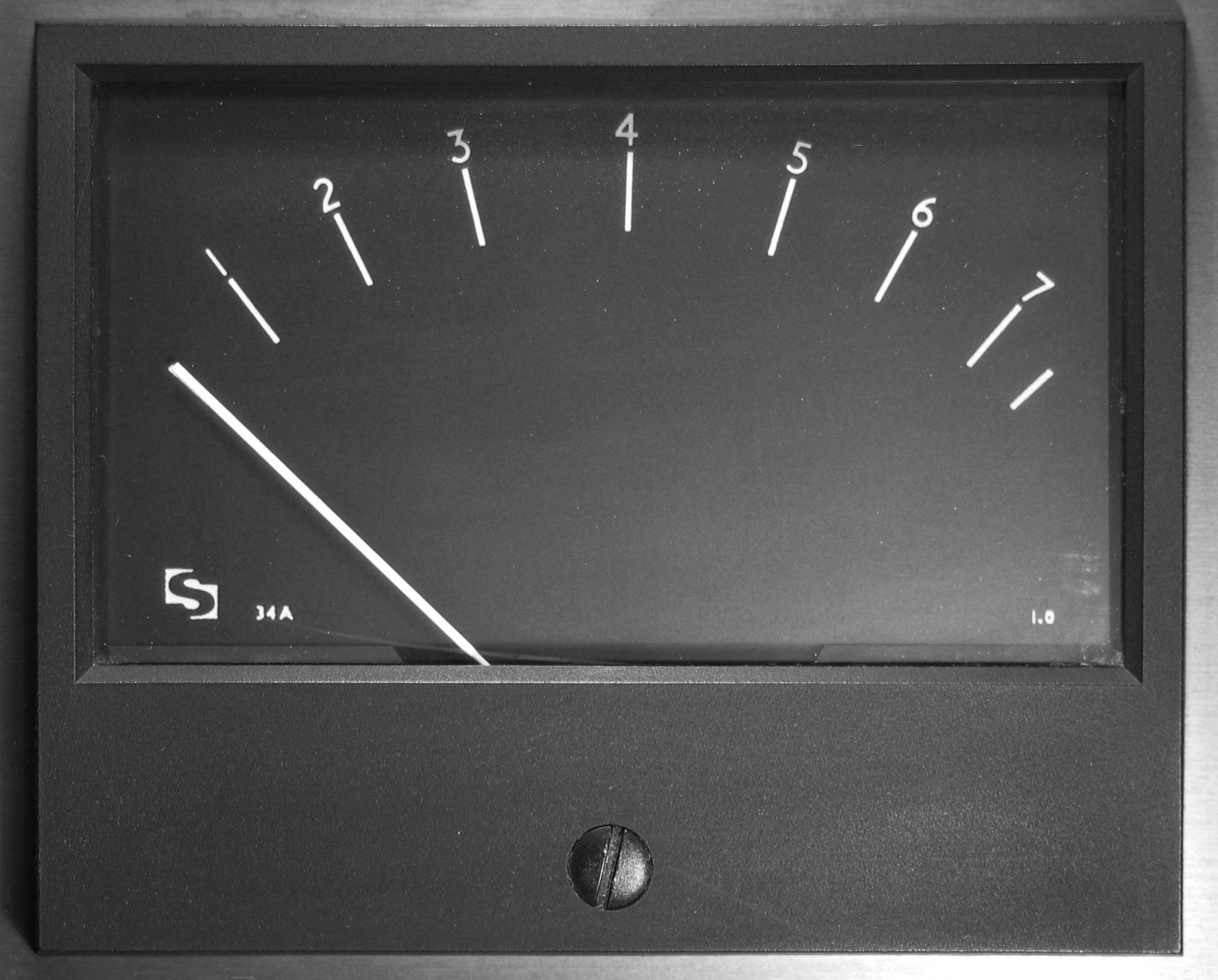
A typical British quasi-PPM. Each division between 1 and 7 is exactly four decibels, and 6 is the intended maximum level.

A peak programme meter (PPM) is an instrument used in professional audio that indicates the level of an audio signal.

Different kinds of PPM fall into broad categories:

- True peak programme meter. This shows the peak level of the waveform, no matter how brief its duration.
- Quasi peak programme meter (QPPM). This only shows the true level of the peak if it exceeds a certain duration, typically a few milliseconds. On peaks of shorter duration, it indicates less than the true peak level. The extent of the shortfall is determined by the 'integration time'.
- Sample peak programme meter (SPPM). This is a PPM for digital audio. It shows only peak sample values, not true waveform peaks (which may fall between samples and may be higher in amplitude). It may have either a 'true' or a 'quasi' integration characteristic.
- Over-sampling peak programme meter. This is a sample PPM that first oversamples the signal, typically by a factor of four, to alleviate the problems of a basic sample PPM.

In professional use, which requires consistent level measurements across an industry, audio level meters often comply with a formal standard. This ensures that all compliant meters indicate the same level for a given audio signal. The principal standard for PPMs is IEC 60268-10. It describes two different quasi-PPM designs that have roots in meters originally developed in the 1930s for the AM radio broadcasting networks of Germany (Type I) and the United Kingdom (Type II). The term Peak Programme Meter usually refers to these IEC-specified types and similar designs. Though originally designed for monitoring analogue audio signals, these PPMs are now also used with digital audio.

PPMs do not provide effective loudness monitoring. Newer types of meters do, and there is now a push within the broadcasting industry to move away from the traditional level meters described in this article to two new types: loudness meters based on EBU Tech. 3341 and oversampling true PPMs. The former would be used to standardise broadcast loudness to −23 LUFS and the latter to prevent digital clipping.

== Design characteristics ==
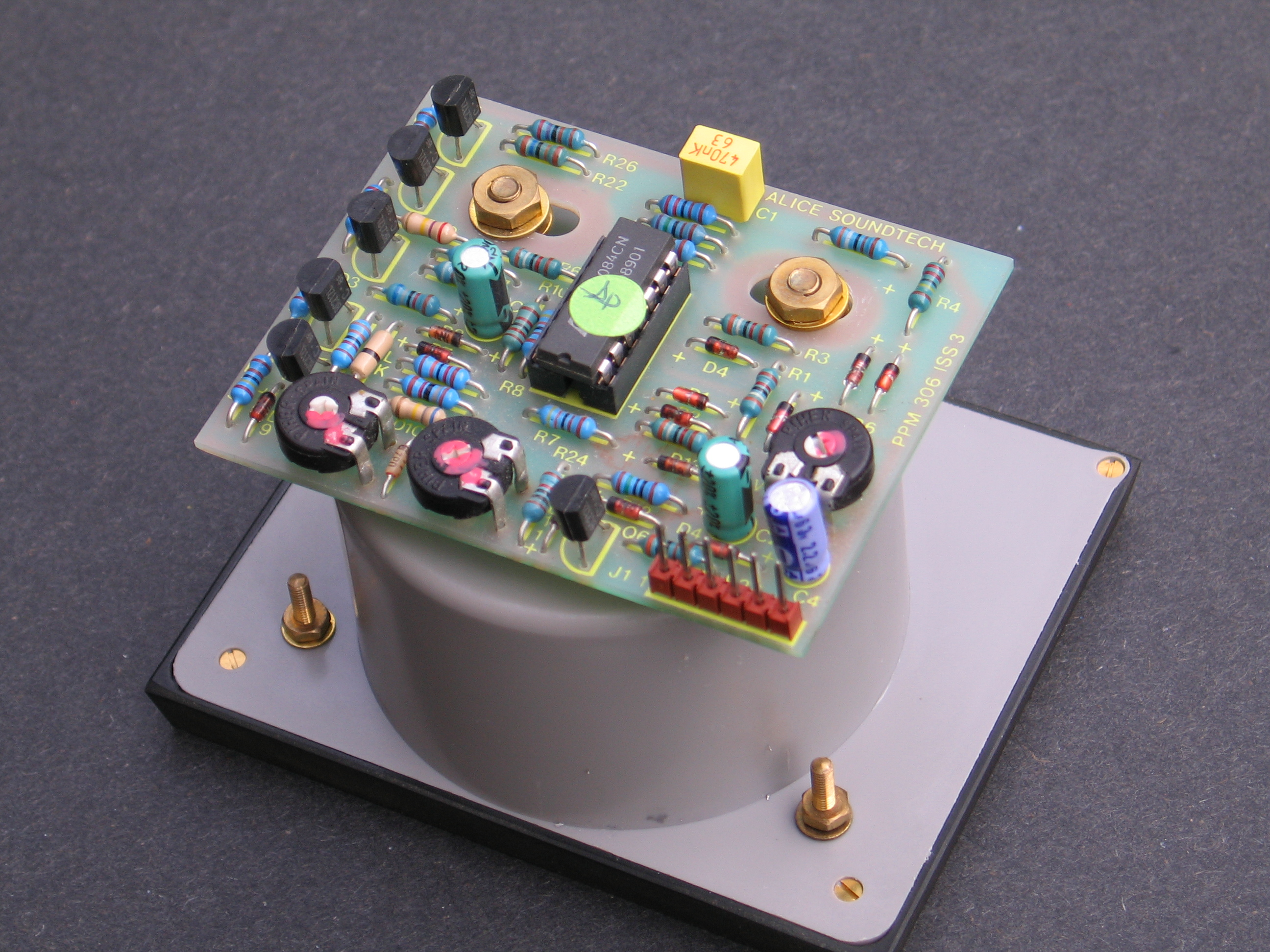
PPMs need active driver electronics – shown here mounted on back of meter movement.

=== Display technologies ===
In common with many other types of audio level meters, PPMs originally used electro-mechanical displays. These took the form of moving-coil panel meters or mirror galvanometers with demanding 'ballistics': the key requirement being that the indicated level should rise as quickly as possible with negligible overshoot. These displays require active driver electronics.

Nowadays, PPMs are often implemented as 'bargraph' incremental displays using solid-state illuminated segments in a vertical or horizontal array. For these, IEC 60268-10 requires a minimum of 100 segments and a resolution better than 0.5 dB at the higher levels.

Many operators prefer the moving-coil meter type of display, in which a needle moves in an arc, because they feel the angular movement is easier for the human eye to monitor than the linear movement of a bar graph.

PPMs can also be implemented in software, in a general-purpose computer or by a dedicated device that inserts a PPM image into a picture signal for display on a picture monitor.

=== Level definitions ===
A variety of terms, such as line-up level and operating level exist, and their meaning may vary from place to place. In an attempt to bring clarity to level definitions in the context of programme transmission from one country to another, where different technical practices may apply, ITU-R Rec. BS.645 defined three reference levels: Measurement Level (ML), Alignment Level (AL) and Permitted Maximum Level (PML). This document shows the readings corresponding to these levels for several types of meters. Alignment Level is the level of a steady sine-wave alignment tone. Permitted Maximum Level refers to the permitted maximum meter indication that operators should aim for on speech, music, etc., not tone.

=== Scales and scale marks ===
PPMs often use white-on-black displays to minimise eye strain, especially with extended periods of use.

PPMs are usually calibrated in one of these ways:

- In decibels relative to Alignment Level (e.g., Nordic, EBU)
- In decibels relative to Permitted Maximum Level (e.g., DIN, ABC, SABC)
- In decibels relative to 0 dBu (e.g., CBC)
- In decibels relative to 0 dBFS (e.g., IEC 60268-18)
- In simple numerical marks that can be correlated with any of the above (e.g., British)

Whichever scheme is used, usually there is a scale mark corresponding to Alignment Level.

Most PPMs have an approximately logarithmic scale, i.e., roughly linear in decibels, to provide useful indications over a wide dynamic range.

=== Integration time ===
Tone burst duration (ms)	Under-indication	
Tone burst duration (ms)	Type I	Type II
100		0 dB
10	−1 dB	−2 dB
5	−2 dB	−4 dB
3	−4 dB	
1.5		−9 dB
0.5		−17 dB
0.4	−15 dB	

Quasi-PPMs use a short integration time so they can register peaks longer than a few milliseconds in duration. In the original context of AM radio broadcasting in the 1930s, overloads due to shorter peaks were considered unimportant on the grounds that the human ear could not detect distortion due to momentary clipping. Ignoring momentary clipping made it possible to increase average modulation levels. In modern digital audio practice, where quality standards are hopefully much higher than AM radio in the 1930s, clipping of even short peaks is usually regarded as something to avoid.

On typical, real-world audio signals, a quasi-PPM under-reads the true peak by 6 to 8 dB. Nevertheless, quasi-PPMs are still widely used in the digital age because of their usefulness in achieving programme balance. Overloads are avoided by allowing, typically, 9 dB of headroom when controlling digital levels with a quasi-PPM.

The extent to which quasi-PPMs show less than the true amplitude of momentary peaks is determined by the 'integration time'. This is defined by IEC 60268-10 as, "...the duration of a burst of sinusoidal voltage of 5000 Hz at reference level that results in an indication 2 dB below reference indication." This standard also contains tables showing the difference between indicated and true peaks for tone bursts of other durations. The longer the integration time, the greater the difference between the true and indicated peaks.

In earlier standards, different methods of measurement and criteria were used, such as 0.2 Neper or 80% voltage instead of 2 dB, but the practical difference between them was small.

A Type I PPM has an integration time of 5 milliseconds and a Type II PPM has an integration time of 10 milliseconds.

=== Return time ===
All PPMs have a return time much longer than the integration time, to give the operator more time to see the peaks and reduce eye strain. Type I PPMs fall back 20 dB in 1.7 seconds. Type II PPMs fall back 24 dB in 2.8 seconds.

== History and national variants ==
The PPM was originally developed independently in both Germany and the United Kingdom, for use in AM radio broadcasting networks in the 1930s. These were quasi-peak meters with some features in common but otherwise substantially different. They are superior to earlier types of meters that were not good for monitoring peak audio levels.

=== IEC 60268-10 Type I PPM ===
==== Germany ====
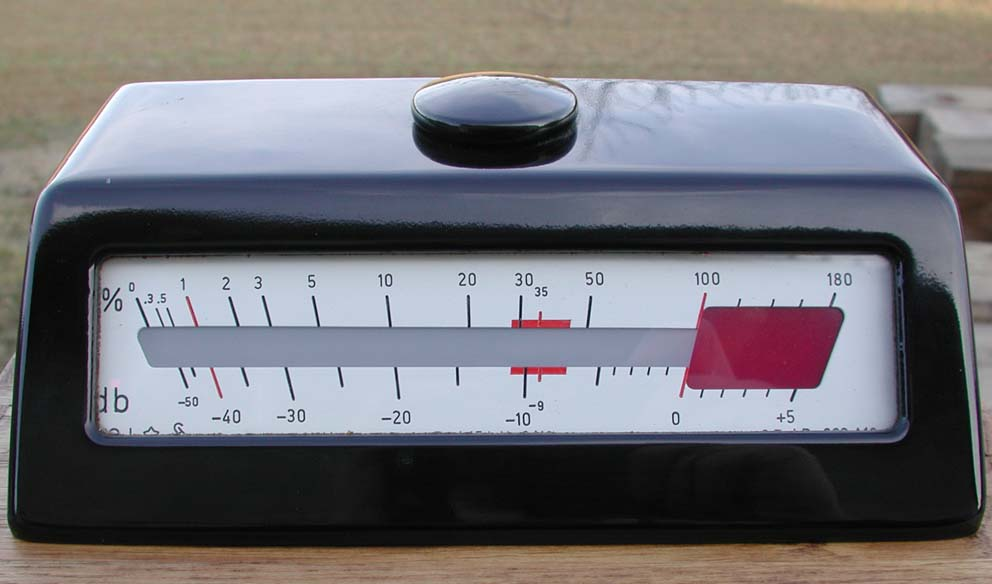
German "Lichtzeigerinstrument" (Siemens & Halske 1950)

A DIN scale quasi-PPM as widely used in Northern Europe.

A Nordic scale quasi-PPM as used in Scandinavia.

In about 1936 and 1937, German broadcasters developed a peak programme meter with a mirror galvanometer known as a "Lichtzeigerinstrument" (light pointer) for the display. The system consisted of a drive amplifier (e.g., ARD types U21 and U71) and a separate display unit (e.g., ARD types J47 and J48). A stereo version, known as a "Doppel-Lichtzeigerinstrument" contained two mirror galvanometer displays in a single housing. Such displays were still used until the 1970s, when solid-state bargraph displays became the norm.

The design became standardised as DIN 45406. It evolved into the Type I meter in IEC 60268-10, and it is still known colloquially as a DIN PPM. Compared to the Type II designs, it has faster integration and return times, a much wider dynamic range and a semi-logarithmic scale, and is calibrated in dB relative to Permitted Maximum Level. It remains in use in much of northern Europe.

In German broadcasting, the nominal analogue signal corresponding to Permitted Maximum Level was standardised by ARD at 1.55 volts (+6 dBu), and this is the usual sensitivity of a DIN-type PPM for an indication of 0 dB. Alignment Level (−3 dBu) is shown on the meter by a scale mark at −9.

==== Scandinavia ====
In Scandinavia a variant of the DIN PPM known as Nordic is used. It has the same integration and return times but a different scale, with TEST corresponding to Alignment Level (0 dBu) and +9 corresponding to Permitted Maximum Level (+9 dBu). Compared to the DIN scale, the Nordic scale is more logarithmic and covers a somewhat smaller dynamic range.

=== IEC 60268-10 Type II PPM ===
==== United Kingdom ====
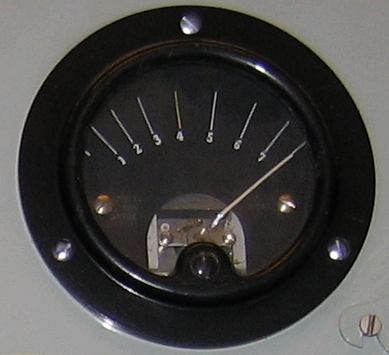
An old-style British PPM with right-hand mechanical zero, as used with valve equipment (switched off when photo taken).

The BBC used a number of methods of measuring programme volume in its early years, including the volume indicator and slide-back voltmeter.

By 1932, when the BBC moved to purpose-built facilities in Broadcasting House, the first audio meter called a programme meter was introduced. It was developed by Charles Holt-Smith of the Research Department and became known as the Smith meter. This was the first meter with white markings on a black background. It was driven by a circuit that gave a roughly logarithmic transfer characteristic, so it could be calibrated in decibels. The overall characteristics were the product of the driver circuit and the movement's ballistics.

The first of the PPMs was designed by C. G. Mayo, also of the BBC's Research Department. It came into service in 1938. It kept the Smith meter's logarithmic, white-on-black display, and included all the key design features that are still used to this day with only slight modification: full-wave rectification, fast integration and slow return times, and a simple scale calibrated from 1 to 7.

Mayo and others determined the integration and return times by a series of experiments. At first, they intended to create a true peak meter to prevent transmitters from exceeding 100% modulation. They created a prototype meter with an integration time of about 1 ms. They found that the ear tolerates distortion of only a few ms, and that a registration time of 4 ms is sufficient. They made the return time a compromise between a rapid return, which was tiring to the eye, and a slow return, which made control difficult. Engineers decided that the meter should take between 2 and 3 seconds to drop back 26 dB.

The BBC PPM became the subject of several formal standards: BS 4297:1968 (superseded); BS5428:Part 9:1981 (superseded) and then BS 6840-10:1991. The text of the latter is identical to the Type IIa PPM in IEC 60268-10:1991.

Alignment level (0 dBu) and Permitted Maximum Level (+8 dBu) correspond to scale marks 4 and 6 respectively.

The BBC PPM was adopted by commercial broadcasters in the UK. Other organisations around the world, including the EBU, CBC and ABC used the same dynamics but with slightly different scales.

Modern British PPMs have a 4 dB spacing between the scale marks. Older designs had a 6 dB spacing between 1 and 2. This discrepancy can sometimes also be found at the equivalent position on the derived CBC and ABC scales.

From its inception in 1939 until 2009, the PPM display was available in the form of an electromechanical, moving-coil meter movement with a demanding ballistic specification. For many years these were manufactured by Ernest Turner and Company, and in later years by Sifam, based in Torquay. In 2009, Sifam announced it was ending production of the Type 74 dual-needle meter movement. In 2010, Sifam ended all PPM meter movement manufacturing. Three major users—Bryant Unlimited, Canford Audio, and TSL—placed final orders with Sifam for large stocks of the meters to supply manufacturing and maintenance activities for several years.

===== Stereo British PPMs =====
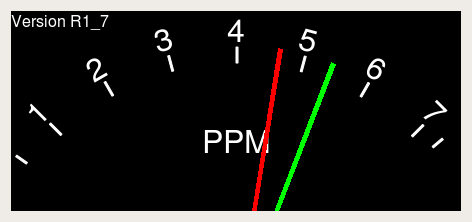
Left/right (AB) mode

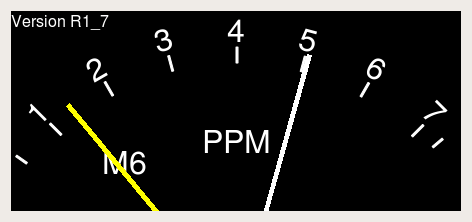
Sum/difference (M6) mode

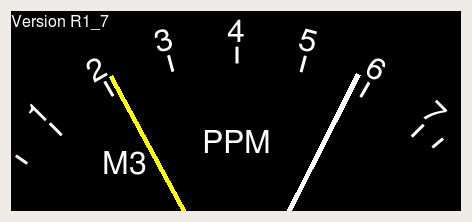
Sum/difference (M3) mode

Stereo PPMs implemented in software: screenshots from BBC Research's open-source baptools package.

In the UK, twin-needle PPMs are sometimes used for stereo. Red and green needles are used for left and right. White and yellow needles are used for sum and difference (M and S). A more recent variation is to use a black needle with a dayglo orange tip for S instead of yellow.

The sensitivity of the S indication can be increased on some meter installations by 20 dB; this is to aid line-up procedures, e.g., of stereo mic pairs, or the azimuth of analogue tape machine heads, which rely on cancellation of the S signal.

====== M3 and M6 ======
M and S meters are normally aligned to the M6 standard in which M = (L + R) − 6 dB and S = (L − R) − 6 dB. In other words, the sum and difference signals are each attenuated by 6 dB before being displayed on the meter. As a result, signals of identical amplitude and phase in the left and right channels make the M meter show exactly the same deflection as for the individual L and R meters. This is because summing two identical signals produces a result 6 dB louder than either source, but the M and S meters show summed signals attenuated by 6 dB to compensate. The M6 standard means that dual mono sources (e.g. a presenter panned to the centre of a stereo sound stage) can be peaked to 6 in both channels, with the M meter also showing 6.

The M6 format has largely replaced the earlier M3 standard in which the sum and difference attenuation is only 3 dB. This M3 format is designed to give a more accurate indication of the level of the summed mono signal when working with conventional stereo material. The premise is that in summing two signals of similar level but carrying non-phase-coherent sounds (i.e., typical stereo material), the result averages 3 dB more than either source channel (rather than 6 dB more). The M3 standard means that true stereo material can be peaked to 6 in both channels, with the M meter also showing 6. However, dual-mono sources can only be peaked to 5.25 in each channel to keep the M meter at 6.

Note: the chosen M6/M3 metering standard does not affect the relative audible balance of sounds panned to one side versus the centre – that is determined solely by the panning law of the mixing console's pan-pot.

The M6 standard is deemed a simpler form of metering for untrained broadcasters to use as it keeps the M meter at 4 for Alignment Level and 6 for peaks, without the operator having to remember to subtract 3 dB.

Commercial broadcasting in the UK initially used M3 but had switched to M6 by 1980. This was mandated by the IBA's Engineering Code of Practice. BBC installations used M3 until 1999. The BBC now uses M6 in both radio and TV, although much legacy equipment is still configured for the traditional M3 standard.

==== European Broadcasting Union ====
An EBU scale quasi-PPM as used for international programme exchange.

The EBU PPM is a variant of the British PPM designed for the control of programme levels in international programme exchange. It is formalised as the Type IIb PPM in IEC 60268-10. It is identical to the British PPM except for the scale plate, which is calibrated in dB relative to Alignment Level, which is marked TEST. There are also ticks at 2 dB intervals and at +9 dB, corresponding to Permitted Maximum Level.

==== United States ====
In the late 1930s PPMs were considered for use in the US, but rejected in favour of a Standard Volume Indicator (VU meter) on grounds of cost. Joint research by CBS, NBC and Bell Labs found that using an experimental design of PPM (with a relatively long integration time of 25 ms) in the control of programme levels gave only a 1 dB advantage over the VU meter, in terms of average output level for a given amount of distortion. It was felt that this was too small to justify the much greater expense. It was also found that VU meters gave more consistent readings than PPMs when comparing programme levels at the sending and receiving end of long lines subject to group delay, which altered the waveform. This finding has been disputed by others.

A widely believed myth is that the PPM was developed as a superior alternative to the VU meter. In fact, the PPM came first, and if anything, the VU meter was developed as an economical alternative to the PPM.

By 1980, ABC had about 100 PPMs in use in control rooms in New York and its Washington News Bureau, and was ordering new consoles with PPMs fitted. These were Type II PPMs with the seven marks labelled −22, −16, −12, −8, −4, 0 and +4. ABC found that a modified version of the EBU meter based on the VU-meter A scale was best, since it let operators use their usual jargon such as zero level etc. The appearance is similar to an EBU scale except that the numbers are 8 dB lower.

To aid alignment on both VU meters and PPMS, ABC in New York used a special test signal known as ATS. A 440 Hz tone alternated between a steady tone at +8 dBu (indicated at 0 VU and −8 PPM) and tone bursts at +16 dBu (indicated at 0 VU and 0 PPM).

==== Canada ====
By 1978 PPMs were in use at the Canadian Broadcasting Corporation's Vancouver plant. Some 30 or 40 PPMs were in use, with just one or two VU meters retained for settling telco disputes. These are Type II PPMs with the seven marks labelled −6, 0, +4, +8, +12, +16 and +20: this scaling shows absolute levels in dBu (or dBm into 600 Ω). The appearance is similar to the ABC PPM except that all the numbers are 16 dB higher.

==== South Africa ====
SABC scale plate on Type II PPM

The South African Broadcasting Corporation (SABC) uses a Type II PPM modified with a black-on-white scale plate calibrated in percentage and dB relative to Permitted Maximum Level, which is +6 dBu. Alignment Level is 0 dBu or 50%.

=== IEC 60268-18 Digital PPM ===
IEC 60268-18 is a partial standard for a PPM designed for use with digital audio in both professional and consumer use, using "incremental dot or bar type displays or numerical displays". Such a display shows level relative to 0 dBFS. The integration time can have any value less than 5 ms − thus, both true-peak and quasi-peak meters can comply, and different meters may indicate very different levels despite compliance with the standard. The return time has the same value as a Type I meter: 1.7±0.3 seconds for a 20 dB fall.

=== Table of characteristics ===
IEC 60268-10 specifies three variants: Types I, IIa and IIb, known colloquially as the DIN, British and EBU types respectively. Types IIa and IIb differ only in the scale marks.

The Nordic, ABC, CBC and SABC variants are not specified in IEC 60268-10. The Nordic PPM uses Type I ballistics with a different scale. The ABC, CBC and SABC variants use Type II ballistics with different scales.

Parameters for the VU meter and Nagra modulometer are included in the table below for comparison. Some information has been obtained from ITU-T Rec. J.15.

Type	Standard	Scale marks	Typical gain structure					Dynamic response		Remarks
Type	Standard	Scale marks	Alignment Level (AL) (tone)		Permitted Maximum Level (PML) (indicated programme peaks)			Integration time (−2 dB) (ms)	Return time	Remarks
Type	Standard	Scale marks	Physical level	Meter indication	w.r.t. AL (dB)	Physical level	Meter indication	Integration time (−2 dB) (ms)	Return time	Remarks
DIN	IEC 60268-10 Type I	−50, −40, −30, −20, −10, −5, 0, +5,	−3 dBu	−9	+9	+6 dBu	0	5	20 dB in 1.7±0.3 s	
Nordic	ditto (variant)	−36, −30, −24, −18, −12, −6, TEST, +6, +9	0 dBu	TEST	+9	+9 dBu	+9	5	20 dB in 1.7±0.3 s	
British	IEC 60268-10 Type IIa	1, 2, 3, 4, 5, 6, 7	0 dBu	4	+8	+8 dBu	6	10	24 dB in 2.8±0.3 s	
EBU	IEC 60268-10 Type IIb	−12, −8, −4, TEST, +4, +8, +12	0 dBu	TEST	+9	+9 dBu	+9	10	24 dB in 2.8±0.3 s	
ABC	ditto (variant)	−22, −16, −12, −8, −4, 0, +4	+8 dBu	−8				10	24 dB in 2.8±0.3 s	
CBC	ditto (variant)	−6, 0, +4, +8, +12, +16, +20	+8 dBu	+8				10	24 dB in 2.8±0.3 s	
SABC	ditto (variant)	−18, −12, −9, −6, 0, +6	0 dBu	−6	+6	+6 dBu	0	10	24 dB in 2.8±0.3 s	
Digital	IEC 60268-18	−60, −50, −40, −35, −30, −25, −20, −15, −10, −5, 0	−18 dBFS	−18	+9	−9 dBFS	−9	<5	20 dB in 1.7±0.3 s	EBU R.68
Digital	IEC 60268-18	−60, −50, −40, −35, −30, −25, −20, −15, −10, −5, 0	−20 dBFS	−20	+11	−9 dBFS	−9	<5	20 dB in 1.7±0.3 s	SMPTE RP.0155
VU meter (N. America, Australia)	IEC 60268-17	−20 to +3 dB	0 or +4 or +8 dBu	0 VU				165 (approx.)		
VU meter (France)		−20 to +3 dB		+2 VU				207±30		ITU-R Rec. BS.645
Nagra modulometer (analogue)	proprietary	−30 to +5 dB		−8	+8		0	7.5		e.g., Nagra 4.2

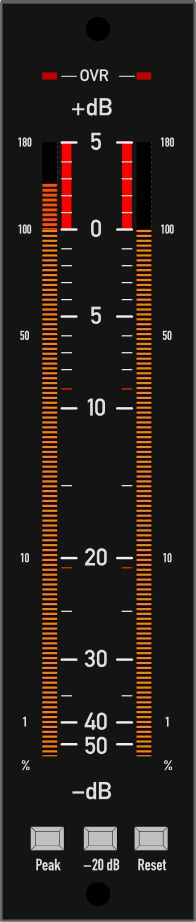
IEC 60268-10 Type I, DIN scale

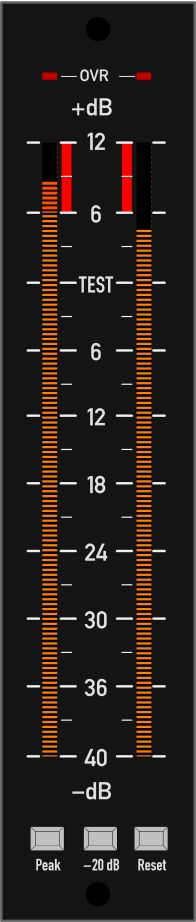
IEC 60268-10 Type I, Nordic scale

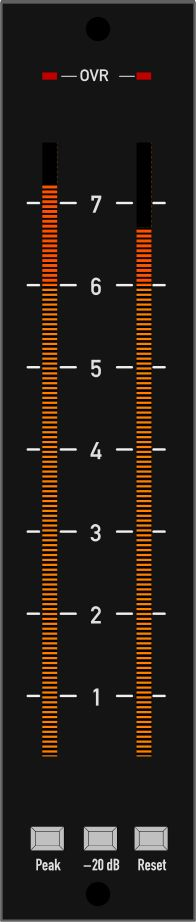
IEC 60268-10 Type IIa, British scale

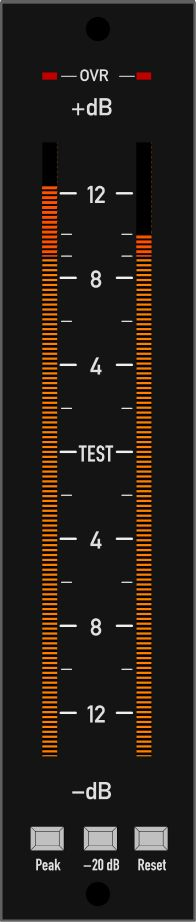
IEC 60268-10 Type IIb, EBU scale

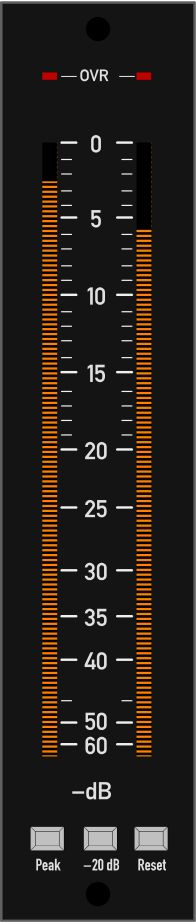
IEC 60268-18, Digital scale

Vertical Bargraph PPMs: comparison of IEC 60268 PPM scales

== Nagra modulometer ==
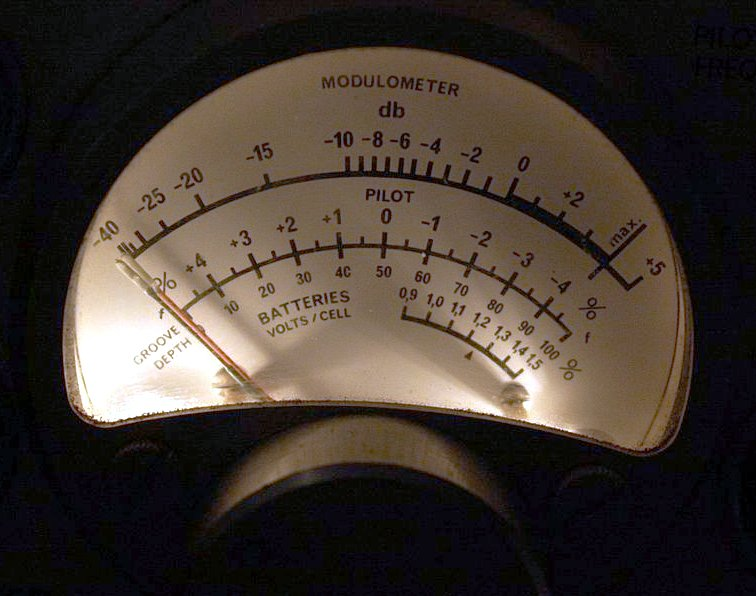
Nagra double modulometer

The modulometer is a proprietary type of quasi-PPM found on Nagra products. It has an integration time (−2 dB) of 7.5 ms, and a semi-logarithmic scale with an appearance between that of a VU meter and a DIN-type PPM. A stereo version ("double modulometer") uses a meter movement with two coaxial needles.

In typical practice for Nagra analogue tape recorders, Alignment Level is regarded as −8 and maximum level 0. Thus, sound recordists using location mixers would typically send a tone at 0 VU or PPM 4 (British) and adjust the Nagra recorder's gain to read −8 on the modulometer.

Some newer digital recorders, e.g., the Nagra VI, have modulometers displayed as bar graphs calibrated in dBFS. For these, Alignment Level is as for any other digital PPM, i.e., −18 dBFS (EBU) or −20 dBFS (SMPTE).

== Usage of meter by sound balancers ==
To use PPMs effectively to control sound levels, it is necessary to understand the design rationale and limitations.

Many engineers prefer the PPM to the much slower VU meter used in the US, but it does require some interpretation in use. Though it gives a useful overload warning, it does not represent either true peak level or subjective loudness. The BBC has tables showing recommended settings for different types of programme, such as speech, classical music, etc., which attempt to take account of the latter.

Regardless of the kind of programme, there is usually a nominal Permitted Maximum Level, as indicated on a PPM. Operators are expected to keep levels below it, within reason. Practices vary between countries and organisations. In the UK, the Permitted Maximum Level is 8 dB above Alignment Level, corresponding to 6 on the British PPM scale. ITU-T standards for international sound programme circuits specify a Permitted Maximum Level of 9 dB above Alignment Level. Accordingly, +9 dB is represented by a mark on the EBU PPM scale.

== Digital audio levels ==
Because quasi-peak PPMs indicate neither loudness nor true peaks but something between the two, it is important to allow sufficient headroom when using them in the control of digital audio levels. The EBU convention (R68) provides for this by defining Alignment Level as −18 dBFS. Thus a peak to the Permitted Maximum Level as indicated on a quasi-PPM corresponds to −9 or −10 dBFS. This 9-10 dB margin allows for operator error, the true peak typically being several dB higher than the PPM indication, and that subsequent signal processing (e.g., sample rate conversion) may increase the amplitude.

SMPTE RP 0155 recommends a different alignment level, corresponding to 0 VU, of −20 dBFS. The two conventions result in line-up tone levels that differ by 2 dB, but in practice the level of programme modulation tends to be similar.

The SMPTE and the EBU agree that regardless of whether −18 or −20 dBFS is used as the Alignment Level, that level should be declared and that in both cases programme should peak to a Permitted Maximum Level of −9 dBFS when measured on an IEC 60268-10 quasi-PPM with an integration time of 10 milliseconds.

== Consumer use ==
IEC 60268-10 is concerned mainly with the highly specified Type I and Type II PPMs used in broadcasting. It does, however, also contain a brief section on PPMs for secondary and consumer applications. The requirements include a minimum of a 12-segment bargraph type display covering a range of −42 dB to +6 dB relative to nominal maximum level, and the same integration and return times as a Type I PPM.
