= EBU R 128 =

EBU recommendation for loudness normalisation

- Loudness normalisation and permitted maximum level of audio signals
- Status: Published
- Year started: 2012
- First published: 2010
- Latest version: 5.0; November 2023
- Organization: European Broadcasting Union
- Related standards: ITU-R BS.1770
- Website: https://tech.ebu.ch/publications/r128/

EBU R 128 is a recommendation for loudness normalisation and maximum level of audio signals. It primarily targets audio mixing of television and radio programmes and has been adopted by broadcasters to measure and control programme loudness. It was first issued by the European Broadcasting Union in August 2010 and most recently revised in November 2023.

R 128 employs an international standard for measuring audio loudness, stated in the ITU-R BS.1770 recommendation and using the loudness measures LU (loudness units) and LUFS (loudness units referenced to full scale), specifically created for this purpose. The EBU Tech 3341 document further clarified loudness metering implementation and practices in 2016.

== Premise ==
Before the adoption of R 128, normalisation was based on the peak level of audio signals, which led to considerable loudness discrepancies between programmes and between broadcast channels. The same peak level does not necessarily produce the same loudness, because the use of dynamic range compression and limiting can increase the average level of the programme without increasing its peak level. Starting from the early 1990s through the early 2010s, both the music and the advertising industries urged the continuation of this practice to ensure that music and advertising spots became louder without exceeding the maximum permitted peak level. This phenomenon is known as the loudness war.

The resulting inconsistencies and changes in loudness, especially between programmes and commercials, became a frequent cause of complaints from viewers and listeners. To help address these problems, the International Telecommunication Union (ITU) developed new algorithms to measure audio programme loudness in a manner similar to how the human ear perceives sounds and studied new methods to measure loudness over a long-term timeframe. This would allow normalising the loudness of different programs and programme contents appropriately.

=== Development ===
To find practical solutions for the switch from peak normalisation to loudness normalisation, the EBU Production Management Committee formed an international working group comprising sound engineers from various radio stations and broadcasting institutes. Its name, PLoud, is derived from a combination of the words production and loudness.

The group first developed evaluation and measurement methods to guide the development of appropriate measurement instruments in the industry. It drafted a technical document to enable broadcasters and programme producers to change their sound processing to the new recommendation, while another technical document dealt with the procedures to follow in the signal distribution.

== Specification ==
=== Definitions ===
To characterise the level and the dynamic range of an audio signal, R 128 introduced new units of measurement:

Unit	Definition	Description	Examples and implementation
L_{K}	K-weighted loudness level	Loudness level measured with K frequency weighting.	R 128 target level is: L_{K} = −23 LUFS
LUFS	Loudness Units referenced to full scale	Loudness measurement unit on an absolute scale, K-weighted, relative to a digital scale (the upper limit of which is 0 dBFS). Equivalent with LKFS, used in ITU-R BS.1770.	R 128 target level is: L_{K} = −23 LUFS
LU	Loudness Unit	Relative loudness measurement. 1 LU corresponds to the relative measurement of 1 dB on a digital scale. LU can also express the difference in level from the target level.	In a loudness meter implementing EBU Mode: Reference level = −23 LUFS = 0 LU; A programme with an integrated loudness of −26 LUFS measures −3 LU in EBU Mode (i.e. is 3 LU quieter than the target level).
LRA	Loudness Range	A statistically determined value that describes the loudness variation (dynamics) of a programme.	R 128 does not prescribe a maximum loudness range. LRA could be limited arbitrarily during production for aesthetic purposes (depending on style or genre) or practical purposes (depending on the environment where the programme is intended to be played back: for example, a home theatre, a mobile device or a cinema).
TP	True Peak	Reconstruction of the inter-sample peak level of the signal (the peak level generated between two samples), calculated by oversampling.	The maximum true peak level permitted by R 128 in production is −1 dBTP.
dBTP	True Peak level referenced to full scale	Level in of the audio signal that takes inter-sample peaks into account, measured in decibels relative to full scale.	The maximum true peak level permitted by R 128 in production is −1 dBTP.

=== Normalisation ===
R 128 recommends normalising audio at the target level of −23 LUFS. This measurement is the integrated loudness calculated over the whole duration of the programme and in the entirety of its contents (i.e., without emphasising specific foreground elements, such as voice). A deviation of ±0.5 LU is permitted. When practical limitations prevent achieving this accuracy (specifically, less predictable materials such as live mixed programmes), a wider tolerance of ±1 LU is permitted. Furthermore, the whole programme must not exceed the peak level of −1 dBTP.

To ensure loudness meters developed by different manufacturers provide the same reading, EBU Tech 3341 defines EBU Mode which describes how to perform the measurement using the ITU-R BS.1770 recommendation.

=== Metering ===
EBU Mode specifies three distinct methods that analyse loudness over three different timeframes:

- Momentary (M), using a sliding time window of 400 ms, best describes the instantaneous loudness;
- Short-term (S), using a sliding time window of 3 seconds, describes a more averaged, less event-dependent loudness of the past three seconds;
- Integrated (I), averaging the programme from start to finish, describes the loudness of the whole programme.

Real-time meters must provide an update rate of at least 10 Hz for short-term meters and of at least 1 Hz for integrated loudness meters.

To prevent silent passages of a programme from misrepresenting the overall loudness measurement, integrated loudness is measured through two gating functions: absolute and relative. The detection gate, specified in ITU-R BS.1770-4, considers silence the portions of audio in which the signal falls below the absolute threshold of −70 LUFS; similarly, the relative gate also drops incoming loudness data if the average level falls 10 LU below the current integrated loudness value. Measurement is not gated in momentary and short-term loudness metering.

== Implementation ==
Screenshot of ebur128, a part of ebumeter program to measure loudness normalisation according to EBU R 128

EBU R 128 and EBU Mode have been implemented by several software developers, audio technology companies and content distributors, including Adobe, Apple, Dolby, iZotope, Magix, PreSonus, Sonible, Sony, NUGEN Audio, Steinberg, TC Electronic, Toyo, Orban and Waves.

Real-time metering plug-ins aid engineers in their mixing decisions and in delivering R 128-compliant programmes, while broadcasters and content distributors can check and normalise whole programmes by performing a faster-than-real-time analysis; programmes produced before the recommendation are likely to be lowered in volume to match the target level.

Ebumeter is open source software that provides level metering according to EBU R 128 and libebur128 an open source library that implements it.

== Adoption and aftermath ==
The recommendation encourages the use of a wider dynamic range in production but does not restrict the use of dynamic range compression. In essence, it ties the use of compression to artistic and aesthetic decisions, rather than the necessity of obtaining a louder mix. With the adoption of normalisation by broadcasters since the introduction of EBU R 128, reducing dynamic range in production does not render the program louder in broadcast. Widespread adoption of ITU-R BS.1770 and EBU R 128, combined with the prevailing of streaming over physical media distribution in the 2010s, arguably put an end to the loudness war.

Starting in 2012, European countries integrated EBU R 128 into their audiovisual legislation and television stations in Europe adopted it on all distribution channels. Sky UK adopted R 128 in 2013.

R 128 is applicable also to radio programmes and is gradually being introduced in European radio broadcasts: for example, German public broadcaster BR changed its radio programmes at the end of 2015.

Since R 128 implementation is not binding, some television stations have imposed additional conditions on programme production. For example, Austrian public broadcaster ORF has a limit of −3 dBTP for data-reduced formats; Franco-German TV network ARTE has published guidelines for LRA; various broadcasters impose maximum momentary and short-term loudness values for short reports, such as commercials.

Through the 2010s, Internet streaming services have implemented loudness-based normalisation, even though each platform uses different methods and target levels: for example, YouTube and Tidal use downward normalisation only (turn down louder content to match the target level, but do not turn up quieter content). Spotify uses ITU-R BS.1770 to measure loudness and normalizes to a selectable target level of −11, −14 or −19 LUFS. Apple Music activates loudness normalisation when the iTunes Sound Check option is enabled.

Target levels (or estimated equivalent level) adopted by streaming services
Target level	Platform
−14 LUFS	Tidal, Amazon Music, YouTube, Spotify
−16 LUFS	Apple Music
−18 LUFS	Qobuz
