= Audio normalization =

Application of gain to a recording to achieve a target level

Audio normalization is the application of a constant amount of gain to an audio recording to bring the amplitude to a target level (the norm). Because the same amount of gain is applied across the entire recording, the signal-to-noise ratio and relative dynamics are unchanged. Normalization is one of the functions commonly provided by a digital audio workstation and is used in broadcast and streaming media delivery.

Two principal types of audio normalization exist. Peak normalization adjusts the recording based on the highest signal level present in the recording. Loudness normalization adjusts the recording based on perceived loudness.

Normalization differs from dynamic range compression, which applies varying levels of gain over a recording to fit the level within a minimum and maximum range. Normalization adjusts the gain by a constant value across the entire recording.

== Peak normalization ==
One type of normalization is peak normalization, wherein the gain is changed to bring the highest PCM sample value or analog signal peak to a given level – usually 0 dBFS, the loudest level allowed in a digital system.

Since it searches only for the highest level, peak normalization alone does not account for the apparent loudness of the content. As such, peak normalization is generally used to change the volume in such a way to ensure optimal use of available dynamic range during the mastering stage of a digital recording. When combined with compression/limiting, however, peak normalization becomes a feature that can provide a loudness advantage over non–peak-normalized material. This feature of digital recording systems, compression and limiting followed by peak normalization, enables contemporary trends in program loudness.

== Loudness normalization ==
Another type of normalization is based on a measure of loudness, wherein the gain is changed to bring the average loudness to a target level. This average may be approximate, such as a simple measurement of average power (e.g. RMS), or more accurate, such as a measure that addresses human perception, e.g. that defined by EBU R128 and offered by ReplayGain, Sound Check and GoldWave.

For example, YouTube's preferred loudness level is −14 LUFS, so if an audio program is analyzed to be −10 LUFS, YouTube will lower the loudness by 4 dB to bring it to the preferred level.

Loudness normalization combats varying loudness when listening to multiple songs in a sequence. Before loudness normalization, one song in a playlist might be quieter than the rest, so the listener would have to turn a volume knob up to adjust the playback volume.

Depending on the dynamic range of the content and the target level, loudness normalization can result in peaks that exceed the recording medium's limits, causing clipping. Software offering loudness normalization typically provides the option of dynamic range compression to prevent clipping when this happens. In this situation, signal-to-noise ratio and relative dynamics are altered.

=== Loudness standards ===
Standardised normalized loudness levels vary by territory and application.

- −27 LUFS to −24 LUFS: Netflix, Disney+ and Prime Video
- −24 LUFS: ATSC A/85 (US TV), NPRSS, and PRX radio broadcast
- −23 LUFS: EBU R 128 broadcast, Sony ASWG for console and desktop games
- −19 to −16 LUFS: PRX podcasts
- −18 LUFS: Sony ASWG for portable and mobile games
- −14 LUFS: Spotify, Tidal, YouTube, YouTube Shorts and TikTok

== See also ==
- Alignment level
- Dialnorm
- Loudness war
- Normalization (image processing), image analog
