= Cubase =

Digital audio workstation

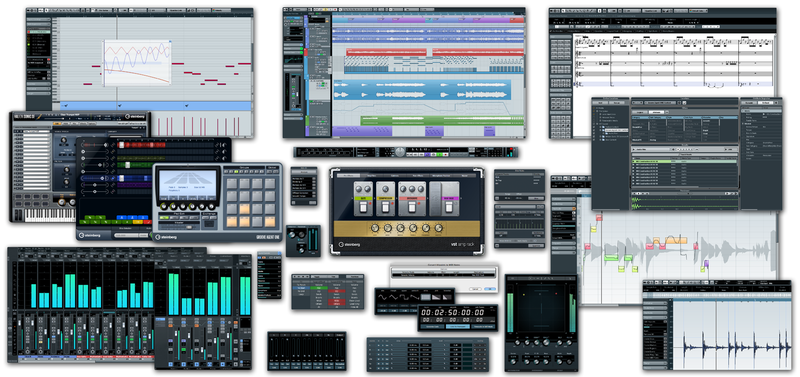
- Cubase 6
- Original author: Steinberg
- Developer: Steinberg
- Release: April 1989; 37 years ago
- Stable release: 15.0.21 / 17 April 2026; 6 months ago
- Written in: C, C++
- Operating system: Windows, macOS
- Available in: 9 languages: English, German, French, Spanish, Italian, Japanese, Chinese, Portuguese, Russian
- Type: Digital audio workstation
- License: Proprietary
- Website: www.steinberg.net/cubase/

Cubase is a German digital audio workstation (DAW) developed by Steinberg for music and MIDI recording, arranging and editing. The first version, which was originally only a MIDI sequencer and ran on the Atari ST computer, was released in 1989. Cubase often comes with electronic instruments.

== Operation ==
Cubase can be used to edit and sequence audio signals coming from an external sound source and MIDI and can host VST instruments and effects. It includes features such as:

- Chord Tracks: Helps the user keep track of chord changes, and can optionally be used to harmonize audio and MIDI tracks automatically, as well as trigger arpeggios and chords with basic voicings or voicings for piano and guitar. Chords can be either entered manually or detected automatically.
- Expression Maps: Adds a lane to the Key Editor (Cubase's piano roll) that allows the user to define changes to the instrument's articulations and dynamics.
- Note Expression: Allows MIDI controllers such as pitch bend, volume, pan, and filters to be applied only to the selected notes. This overcomes one of the limitations of MIDI, where such controllers normally affect the entire channel (For example, all notes of a chord are equally affected by a pitch bend message).
- Key Editor Inspector: Provides precise control over chord drawing, chord inversions, quantization, transpositions, scale correction, note lengths, and legato. Changes can be applied either to only the selected notes or the entire MIDI part being edited.
- Audio Warp Quantize: Create warp markers straight from hitpoints, both single audio loops as well as the entire arrangement can be non-destructively quantized.

MIDI parts can be edited using a piano roll, a dedicated drum editor, a score editor, or as a filterable complete list of MIDI events.

The user can also mix the various tracks down into a stereo .wav file ready to be burned to a compact disc (CD) in Red Book format, or .mp3 burned to CD or DVD as files, or to be published on the Web.

== VST instruments ==
Cubase VST 3.7 in 1999 introduced a virtual instrument interface for software synthesizers known as VSTi. This made it possible for third-party software programmers to create and sell virtual instruments for Cubase. This technology has become a de facto standard for other DAW software, when integrating software based instruments on the Macintosh and Windows platforms. A new version of VST, VST3, was introduced with Steinberg's Cubase 4 which introduced improved handling of automation and audio output, native sidechaining, and many other features. Cubase 6 included VSTs such as HALion Sonic SE, Groove Agent ONE, LoopMash 2 and VST Amp Rack.

== Editions ==
When Cubase 6 was released in 2011, Steinberg introduced 5 different editions for different levels of use. While they all run on the same audio engine, the lower tiers have limits on the number of certain types of tracks.

In 2013, Steinberg introduced Cubasis for iPad, a Cubase for iOS. This version was a full rewrite and supports MIDI and audio tracks, audiobus and virtual MIDI to work with external music apps from the first versions. In 2016, Cubasis 2 was released as a free update.

In late 2019, Cubasis 3 followed as a new app and introduced iPhone support. In mid-2020, Cubasis 3 was released for Android tablets and smartphones.

== History ==
Cubase has existed in three main incarnations. Initially Cubase, which featured only MIDI. The first version of Cubase was for Atari ST, and the Macintosh and Windows versions followed later. Cubase was visualized by Wolfgang Kundrus, and implemented by a team including Werner Kracht, Stefan Scheffler, Michael Michaelis and Karl Steinberg who mainly contributed the run-time system M-ROS.

The next version, Cubase VST, featured fully integrated audio recording and mixing along with effects. It added Virtual Studio Technology (VST) support, a standard for audio plug-ins. Cubase VST was only for Macintosh and Windows.

Cubase SX (based on Steinberg's flagship post-production software Nuendo) dramatically altered the way the program ran. Cubase SX featured real-time time-stretching and adjustment of audio tempo, much like Sonic Foundry's ACID.

In January 2003, Steinberg was acquired by Pinnacle Systems, within which it operated as an independent company before being sold to Yamaha Corporation in December, 2004.

In September 2006 Steinberg announced Cubase 4, the successor to Cubase SX3. Cubase 4 includes a 'control room', a feature designed to help create monitor mixes.

In 2017, Steinberg received the MIPA (Musikmesse International Press Award) for Cubasis 2 in the Mobile Music App category at the Musikmesse in Frankfurt.

== Versions ==
| Version | Released | Information |
|---|---|---|
| Cubase 1.0 Atari | April 1989 | Originally called Cubeat, later on Cubit, but changed to Cubase due to trademark issues, this was the successor to Pro-24. Cubase for Atari was MIDI only and ran on the Atari 520ST and Atari 1040ST computers, provided they had 1 MB of RAM (the 520 with 1 MB of RAM is effectively a 1040 anyway). It required use of an Atari SM-124 monochrome monitor, which gave a then impressive resolution of 640x400, at a rock-solid 71.25 Hz. The main innovation of Cubase was the graphic arrange page, which allowed for the graphic representation of the composition using a vertical list of tracks and a horizontal timeline. This was much more intuitive and allowed much easier editing than the prior system of parameter lists. It has since been copied by just about every other similar product. |
| Cubase 1.0 Macintosh | 1990 | Cubase 1.0 is released for Apple Macintosh computers. |
| Cubase 2.0 Atari | April 1990 | Only supports format 0 MIDI files. |
| Cubase Audio | 1991 | Macintosh, this version relied on the TDM system from Digidesign for the audio portion. |
| Cubase Audio | 1993 | Release on Atari Falcon 030. This version brings digital signal processor (DSP) built-in effects with 8-track audio recording and playback using only native hardware. It was an incredible solution for the price at this time. Later versions enable 16-track mode using audio compression. |
| Cubase 3.0 Atari | 1992 | |
| Cubase for Windows 3.0 | 1992 | |
| Cubase Score for Windows 3.11 | 1993 | Cubase Score is released for Windows offering key, list, logical, drum, and score editing, printing, and a GM/GS editor. |
| Cubase 2.8 for Windows | 1996 | The Arrange Window was redesigned. Features included the Interactive Phrase Synthesizer, CueTrax and StyleTrax: the "virtual Band". |
| Cubase Audio 1.6 for Windows | 1996 | Cubase Audio 1.6 supported the hard disk recording functions of Session8 and Yamaha's CBX D3/D5 Cubase Audio supported Digidesign's new AudioMedia III PCI card. Used in conjunction with AudioMedia III Cubase Audio gave 8 audio tracks, EQ and automation. |
| Cubase Audio 3.0 TDM for Macintosh | 1996 | Cubase Audio 3.0 TDM had up to 16 Audio Tracks with TDM Support for up to 48 Physical Audio Tracks. Cubase Audio 3.0 TDM contained all the new features of Cubase Score 2.0. It also had OMS II Support and MovieManager Support. |
| Cubase Audio XT 3.0 | 1996 | This release provides extended hardware support not featured in other versions of cubase. Hardware options included the Digidesign Session 8 & AudioMedia III PCI, Yamaha CBXD3 & CBXD5, Akai DR8 & DR16, & the Creamware Master port. Recording multiple tracks at once was possible. One of the last versions of Cubase that is still compatible with Windows 3.11. |
| Cubase Score 3.0 | 1996 | At the time of this release, the Cubase lineup consisted of the following programs (in hierarchical order) Cubasis(midi), Cubasis Audio, Cubase (standard, included audio), Cubase Score (Audio+Notation), Cubase Audio XT (Flagship product). This version was upgradeable to Cubase Audio XT. One of the last versions of Cubase still compatible with Windows 3.11. |
| Cubase VST 3.0 Macintosh | 1996 | In 1996, Steinberg increased its share of MIDI + audio sequencers with the Virtual Studio Technology (VST) versions of Cubase. VST also included standards for plug-ins and virtual instruments, which were then also incorporated into third-party products. Up to 32 tracks of digital audio. Up to 128 realtime EQs. Professional effects rack with 4 multi-effect processors. Plug in interface for external plug-ins, allowing external audio technology to be integrated into the Cubase environment. Professional score printing, up to 60 staves per page, 8-voice polyphony. Had a bug limiting memory in the host system to 64 MB on the PowerMac. Was eventually resolved with a patch. |
| Cubase VST 3.5 Macintosh | Aug 1997 | Separate access to all audio inputs + outputs in conjunction with multi i/o audio hardware (amIII, 1212) via a flexible audio routing system; new channel plugins: chorus2, electrofuzz, wunderverb3; new master plugin scorpion; backup option via dat stream. |
| Cubase VST 3.5 for Windows 95 | Oct 1997 | Windows Cubase VST provided up to 32 tracks of digital audio, 128 equalizers in real time, a fully equipped effects rack with four multi-effect processors, a master section and an open plug-in interface for additional real time effects and mastering tools. VST for Windows also supported Active Movie compatible plug-ins. Cubase Audio VST 3.5 + Wavelab 1.6 + Waves AudioTrack was bundled in the first "Producer Pac". This version is native Windows 95 code + is the first version of Cubase for Windows that is incompatible with Windows 3.11. |
| Cubase VST 3.5.5 for Windows 95 | 1998 | Other new features include updated implementation of DirectX plug-ins, allowing the user to organize the list of installed plug-ins according to personal preferences. Support for Recycle export files (.REX files). This allows the use of 'recycled' sample loops right in VST audio tracks without using a dedicated hardware sampler. VST Audio Engine can now be disabled while VST is running (from within the Audio System Menu) or by launching the program while holding the Shift key. |
| Cubase VST 24 3.6 | 1998 | 96 tracks, submixers, ReWire, 8 FX sends and eight aux. VST/24 3.6 supports the entire functionality of Yamaha's DSP Factory card. |
| Cubase VST 24 3.7 for Windows | Jul 1999 | This version introduced VST 2.0, which allowed VST plugins to receive MIDI data from Cubase. It also introduced the concept of VST instruments - earlier implementations of VST had been biased towards effects plugins - and included Neon, a free VST instrument. VST24 3.7 was the first sequencer ever to support VST instruments, as Steinberg had invented the "VSTi" specification. |
| Cubase VST 24 4.0 Macintosh | 1998 | Macintosh only. Cubase VST24 4.0 now offers 96 tracks of 24 bit, 96 kHz digital audio with Digidesign Pro Tools 24 digital audio hardware systems. |
| Cubase VST 24 4.1 Macintosh | Jul 1999 | Macintosh only. Downloadable as a free upgrade to owners of VST24 4.0. Introduced VST 2.0 (and thus, first to provide VST instrument ability on the mac), ASIO 2.0, DSP Factory support, TDM support and more. Also, the Cubase VST/24 Mixer/EQ section included an extension with five new real-time processing modules — Compressor, Limiter, Auto Gate, Auto Limit and Soft Clip. Several VST elements could also now be controlled remotely by external devices such as the Yamaha 01-V. |
| Cubase VST 32 5.0 | Sep 2000 | Large update to the Windows product bringing it in sync with the Macintosh product which had included more features such as: 15,360 ppqn internal resolution, Folder Tracks, Marker Tracks, Long Track Names, Transport Bar display options, User-definable Toolbar and key commands, Extended Inspector, Improved drag and drop, Enhanced Toolbox (including Range Selection tool), New Controller Editor, Grooves and Logical presets, Window Sets, Dedicated MIDI Track Mixer. The last version still compatible with Windows 95. Applying the update to 5.1 is said to require Windows 98. |
| Cubase VST 32 5.1 | 2001 | Was available individually and as part of a Producer's Pack featuring Recycle loop editor and Rebirth virtual instrument (non-VST format), programs developed by Propellerheads but distributed by Steinberg. The Propellerheads products came on Mac and PC compatible CDs, but the disc and serial hasp for Cubase were PC-only. Primarily was introduced to run on the new Windows XP operating system. |
| Cubase SX 1.0/ Cubase SL1.0 | 2002 | Cubase SX1.0 was released as the next generation after Cubase VST. It used the engine of a contemporary sister program as a base, Nuendo V1.0, and was a total rewrite over the prior versions of Cubase. Although bringing vast improvements in stability and feature quality, some features from Cubase VST initially didn't make it into the new version. SX 1.0 allows importing of Cubase VST projects and saving them in the new *.cpr format, however the conversion isn't perfectly accurate. |
| Cubase SX 2.0/Cubase SL2.0 | 2003 | Cubase SX2.0 was hailed by many as a huge leap in functionality. One of the most innovative features was called Timewarp. This allowed users to record music either as MIDI and/or Audio in freetime, without click or metronome, and then move the bars and beats grid to the music, automatically creating a tempo track. The Timewarp tool allowed users to move gridlines. Cubase SX2.0 also saw the introduction of Full PDC (plug-in delay compensation). Many plug-ins, particularly those which run on DSP Cards such as UAD-1 or Powercore, cannot process their audio within a 1-sample time period and thus introduce extra latency into the system. Unchecked, this will cause some audio channels to end up out of sync with others. PDC checks all the various latencies introduced by such plug-ins and creates audio delay buffers to ensure that audio from all channels is correctly synchronized. |
| Cubase SX 3.0 | 2004 | One of the major features to arrive with Cubase SX3.0 was Audiowarp. It allowed Audio to remain in sync with the project even after changing its tempo. It also allowed users to apply 'tempo anchors' to an imported audio file so it would sync to the tempo of the project regardless of the original tempo. Audiowarp was largely successful, but had a major flaw in that it didn't work with variable tempo projects. This was because the tempo map it copied to the Audio file when musical mode was enabled was derived from the fixed tempo setting of the project rather than from the tempo track. Nonetheless Audiowarp was an important addition to the musical features of Cubase. Despite the caveats, having the ability to change the tempo of a musical piece and have the audio tracks follow this new tempo was an important ability in music production. |
| Cubase 4.0 | 2006 | Cubase 4.0 marked the end of the SX, SL and SE designations, with SX becoming Cubase 4, SL becoming Cubase Studio 4 and SE becoming Cubase Essentials 4. It introduced the new VST 3 plug-in standard, and also removed support for the increasingly irrelevant DirectX plugin standard. Cubase 4 was the first Cubase version not to support the import of Cubase VST songs and projects. To give the ability to import older Cubase VST projects and songs, Steinberg decided to make the prior Cubase SX3 and Cubase SL3 versions available as downloads. Cubase 4.0 brought a GUI change. In general the GUI was darker than the prior version, Cubase SX3. With this version the preset system was changed. The FXP (Preset) and FXB (Bank) files were discontinued along with the drop-down menu XML presets. They were replaced by a preset system that integrates in a new feature, the Media Bay, which allows deeper categorizing and managing of presets. |
| Cubase 4.1 | October 23, 2007 | Apart from many bug fixes, V4.1 added some new features, including Sidechaining, Free Group Routing, Project Logical Editor, and Recording from Sum Objects. Existing Features were also improved including the Play Order Track and the Audiowarp, which is now integrated into the Audio Sample editor. |
| Cubase 4.5 | September 3, 2008 | |
| Cubase 5.0 | January 27, 2009 | |
| Cubase 6.0 | January 17, 2011 | Cubase 6.0 was designed to run on 64-bit Windows 7. Cubase 6 features the new VST 3.5 standard, that introduces new features such as Note Expression. With Note Expression, the limits of MIDI controller events are circumvented, enabling articulation information for individual notes, even in polyphonic arrangement (e.g. chords). |
| Cubase 6.5 | February 29, 2012 | Introduction of PADSHOP and RETROLOGUE plugins. |
| Cubase 7.0 | December 5, 2012 | New features include MixConsole, an improved workflow including full-screen ability, and redesigned channel strips and channel centrals. It also includes a new Chord Track and a Chord Assistant. |
| Cubase 7.5 | December 4, 2013 | Enhancements of workflow like the alternative TrackVersions and track visibility management system. It also included Groove Agent SE 4, HALion Sonic SE 2, LoopMash FX and the REVelation reverb. |
| Cubase 8.0 | December 3, 2014 | Performance boost for more instruments, more tracks and shorter loading/saving times. VCA faders for complex mixing and automation workflows. Render in-place: Bounce MIDI and audio parts easily. Chord pads: A great way to playfully and creatively compose with chords. Improved windows handling on PC, dockable rack and MediaBay plus a redesigned Track List. Groove Agent SE 4 Acoustic Agent enabling acoustic drum programming. Plug-in manager: Arrange, sort and group your effects and instruments. New Virtual Bass Amp, Quadrafuzz v2, Multiband Expander, Multiband Envelope Shaper effects. Mixing updates: Virgin territories automation mode, direct routing and Wave Meters. Allen Morgan Pop-Rock Toolbox: 30 construction kits, each with 25 to 30 audio and MIDI loops. |
| Cubase 8.5 | December 2, 2015 | Various MIDI and Drum Editor enhancements, enabled saving and sharing arrangements in clouds via "VST Transit", upgrade of analogue synthesizer "Retrologue" (implementation of third oscillator, 12 new filter types, a third bipolar envelope curve, an own effects rack and four-track step sequencer), enabled option to import tracks from other projects and improved Drag and drop. |
| Cubase 9.0 | December 7, 2016 | Improvements to cloud collaboration clouds via "VST Transit", docked windows with the new "Lower Zone" gives access to MIDI editors, sample editor, mix window and new Sampler Track without leaving project window and comes with "Caleidoscope" with hundreds of samples. Undo history separated in the Mix Window. 10 marker tracks (similar to Nuendo 7 which has 32), Autopan Plug-in, Maximizer, new Sentinel scans plug-ins to check stability. New EQ with M/S support and auto listen to EQ bands with included keyboard for easier frequency to pitch recognition. 400 new drum loops via "Production Gooves". The top 5 feature requests for Cubase 9 were: 1. Parameter undo/redo history for MixConsole 2. Enhanced window handling 3. Extend options to import tracks/channels in a project 4. Extend resizing possibilities for the rack zone 5. Basic sampler |
| Cubase 9.5 | November 15, 2017 | Graphics performance improvements, Zoning 2.0, automation curves, advanced metronome options, 64-bit mixing engine, more inserts with flexible pre/post fader, new look for Vintage Compressor, Tube Compressor and Magneto III, direct offline processing, HALion Sonic SE 3 featuring FLUX wavetable synth, automation range tool, Adapt to Zoom, new video engine (no longer QuickTime dependent), Softube Console 1 support, Sampler Track enhancements, production presets. |
| Cubase 10.0 | November 15, 2018 | Interface Improvements, High DPI display support (only on Mac), VariAudio 3, Audio Alignment, Channel Strip Revision, Groove Agent SE 5, Mix Console Snapshots, Multi-Dimensional Controller Support, VR Production Suite, Side Chaining Improvements, AAF Import & Export, new Distroyer Processor effect, Latency Monitor, ARA Support, MPE support. |
| Cubase 10.5 | November 13, 2019 | Spectral comparison EQ mode, Video renderer, Multi-tap delay, Padshop 2 plugin, Colorizer mixer channels, Import tracks from other project, Retrospective MIDI recording, Combined selection tools, Score editor fixes, Easier macro recording, LUFS normalization, Start in Safe Mode, Various workflow improvements. |
| Cubase 11.0 | November 11, 2020 | Advanced Audio Export, Sampler Track 2, Scale Assistant, Advanced Key Editor, Global Tracks, Frequency 2, Squasher, Score Editor, New Samples, SuperVision, Imager, MultiTap Delay Surround Support, Windows 10 Variable DPI, Multiple Side-Chain, Cubase Artists/Elements Upgrades, VST Connect SE 5, Workflow and UI Improvements, Apple Metal Acceleration, SpectraLayers One. |
| Cubase 12.0 | March 2, 2022 | No more dongle, MIDI Remote integration, VariAudio with Scale Assistant, Audio to MIDI chords, FX Modulator, AudioWarp improvements, Editing workflow improvements, Raiser and more. |
| Cubase 13.0 | November 2, 2023 | MixConsole overhaul, improvements include Range tool, Step and MIDI input, key editor, track versioning, and channel tab. New VocalChain, equalizer and vocal compressor plug-ins. New Iconica Sketch orchestral VST instrument. Discontinuation of Project Browser and VST Transit. |
| Cubase 14.0 | November 6, 2024 | Release notes |
| Cubase 15.0 | November 5, 2025 | Release notes |
| Cubase 16.0 | November 4, 2026 | Release notes |

== Notable users ==
Some notable users include:

- Alan Parsons
- Alan Silvestri
- Aleksandr Zatsepin
- Amon Tobin
- Avicii
- Benjamin Wallfisch
- Brian Tyler
- Christopher Lennertz
- Christopher Young
- Chvrches
- Cirkut
- David Kahne
- Deadmau5
- Depeche Mode
- Don Diablo
- Edwin Wendler
- Game Freak
- Gerard Marino
- The Glitch Mob
- Graeme Norgate
- Grant Kirkhope
- Hans Zimmer
- Hardwell
- Harry Gregson-Williams
- Hildur Guðnadóttir
- Ian Kirkpatrick
- Infected Mushroom
- Inon Zur
- Jack Wall
- Jake Gosling
- James Hannigan
- James Newton Howard
- Jason Graves
- Jesper Kyd
- Joel Wanasek
- Joey Sturgis
- Jóhann Jóhannsson
- Justice
- Junkie XL
- Kim Namjoon
- Koen Heldens
- Kraftwerk
- Ladytron
- Lorne Balfe
- Marillion
- Martin Solveig
- Michael Hunter
- Michael Wagener
- The Mission (UK)
- New Order
- Nils Frahm
- Noisia
- Paul Haslinger
- Paul McCartney
- Paul Oakenfold
- Pieter Schlosser
- Pinar Toprak
- Rupert Gregson-Williams
- Sandy Vee
- Steve Jablonsky
- Stéphane Picq
- Sweet Trip
- Thomas Bergersen
- Tiësto
- Trevor Morris
- Two Steps from Hell
- T+Pazolite
- Wayne Hussey
- Yasutaka Nakata
- The Weeknd
- Zedd

== See also ==
- Audio Stream Input/Output (ASIO)
