= Commercial Advertisement Loudness Mitigation Act =

2010 United States legislation

The Commercial Advertisement Loudness Mitigation Act (H.R. 1084/S. 2847) (CALM Act) requires the U.S. Federal Communications Commission to bar the audio of TV commercials from being broadcast louder than the TV program material they accompany by requiring all "multichannel video programming" distributors to implement the "Techniques for Establishing and Maintaining Audio Loudness for Digital Television" issued by the international industry group Advanced Television Systems Committee. The final bill was passed on September 29, 2010.

No specific penalties are given; those are to be set by the FCC in its regulations. A TV broadcaster or distributor is "in compliance" if it installs and uses suitable equipment and software. Unlike some FCC regulations, cable system operators are subject to the rule in addition to broadcast stations.

After issuing regulations, the FCC began enforcing those regulations on December 13, 2012, after a one-year grace period.

== History ==
The bill was the U.S. Senate companion to proposed legislation in the House of Representatives by Representative Anna Eshoo (D-CA), a member of the Energy and Commerce Committee. She said she was motivated to write the bill after a loud commercial interrupted conversation at a family dinner; when she turned to her brother-in-law, asking him to "do something" about the loud television, he replied, "Well, you're the congresswoman. Why don't you do something about it?". According to Eshoo, no one turned her down when she looked for supporters to the bill, and it passed the Communications Subcommittee. The technical requirements for measuring loudness were taken entirely from a formerly voluntary "recommended practice" issued by the Advanced Television Systems Committee (ATSC) on November 4, 2009. Eshoo told The Wall Street Journal that legislation to mitigate the volume of commercials on TV was among the most popular pieces of legislation she has sponsored in her 18 years in Congress.

Prior to adjourning for the midterm recess, the United States Senate unanimously passed the bill on September 30, 2010. Before it was signed into law in December, minor differences between the two versions had to be worked out when Congress returned to Washington after the November 2 election. The reconciled bill was signed into law by President Barack Obama on December 15, 2010, as Public Law 111–311.

On May 27, 2011, the FCC released a Notice of Proposed Rulemaking (NPRM), Media Bureau (MB) Docket 11–93, to implement the CALM Act. Twelve parties filed comments, which are now available in the FCC's Electronic Comment Filing System (ECFS).

The FCC adopted its rules on December 13, 2011, and they took effect on December 13, 2012. Television viewers are asked to report loud commercials that violate this bill to the FCC.

However the act does not affect streaming, cable, and internet commercials, so loud commercials still occur in those mediums.
