= LUFS =

Loudness measurement unit

Loudness units relative to full scale (LUFS), also known as loudness, K-weighted, relative to full scale (LKFS), is a standard loudness measurement unit used for audio normalization in broadcast television systems and other video and music streaming services. LUFS is a synonym for LKFS that was introduced in EBU R 128.

LKFS is standardized in ITU-R BS.1770. In March 2011, the International Telecommunication Union (ITU) introduced a loudness gate in the second revision of the recommendation, ITU-R BS.1770-2. In August 2012, the ITU released the third revision of this recommendation ITU-R BS.1770-3. In October 2015, the ITU released the fourth revision of this recommendation ITU-R BS.1770-4. In November 2023, the ITU released the fifth revision of this recommendation ITU-R BS.1770-5.

K-weighting refers to the frequency weighting function applied to the audio signal before measurement, and is defined in ITU-R BS.1770.

The European Broadcasting Union (EBU) has suggested that the ITU should change the unit to LUFS, as LKFS does not comply with scientific naming conventions and is not in line with the standard set out in ISO 80000-8. Furthermore, they suggest the symbol for loudness level, k-weighted should be L_{k}, which would make L_{k} and LUFS equivalent when LUFS indicates the value of L_{k} with reference to digital full scale.

LKFS and LUFS are both absolute scales with units of decibels (dB).

Loudness units (LU) is an additional unit used in EBU R128. It describes L_{k} without a direct absolute reference and therefore describes loudness level differences.

== See also ==
- dBFS
