= Rockfield Studios =

Recording studio in Monmouthshire, Wales

Coordinates: 51°49′21″N 2°44′36″W

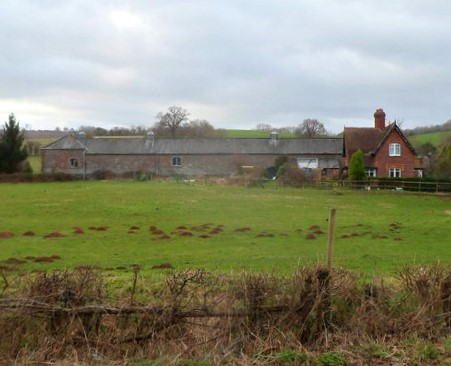
- Industry: Music
- Founded: 1963; 63 years ago
- Founder: Kingsley and Charles Ward
- Headquarters: Rockfield, Wales
- Website: rockfieldmusicgroup.com

Rockfield Studios is a residential recording studio located in the Wye Valley in Monmouthshire, south-east Wales, close to the village of Rockfield. The studio was founded in 1963 by brothers Kingsley and Charles Ward.

== Recording studios ==
Rockfield is a two-studio facility consisting of The Coach House and The Quadrangle. Both studios are in converted solid-stone farm buildings. Rockfield was one of the world's first recording studios to provide living accommodation for clients.

=== The Coach House ===
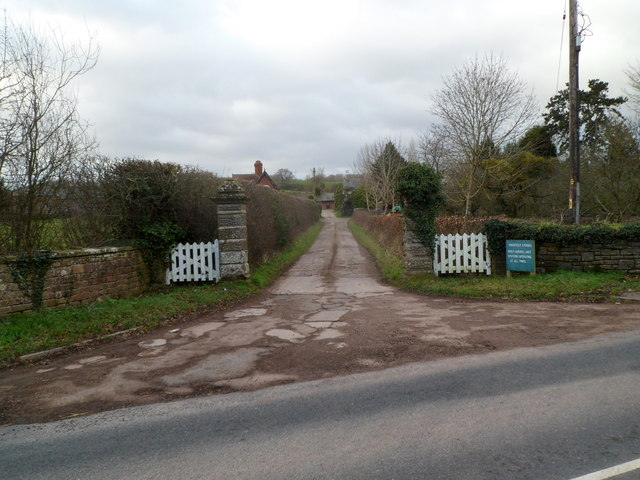
The entrance to the studios

Constructed in 1968, The Coach House includes a large 150-square-metre (1,600 sq ft) live area with stone walls, a wooden ceiling and a Yamaha grand piano. It has a stone drum room, an acoustically variable second drum room, and two isolation booths. Recording equipment is based on a customised Neve 8128 recording console with vintage outboard processing, including Neve 1060 microphone amps, Rockfield's original Rosser Electronics microphone amps, API 550 equalisers and UREI 1176 compressors.

Artists who have recorded in The Coach House include Hawkwind, Queen, Oasis, Bullet for My Valentine, Brian Eno, Sepultura, Jayce Lewis, Simple Minds, The Cure and Opeth.

=== The Quadrangle ===
Constructed in 1973, The Quadrangle has a total of 170 square metres (1,800 sq ft) of recording space spread between the main area, with a Bösendorfer grand piano, two large variable acoustic drum rooms and three isolation booths. Recording equipment in the central control room is based on an MCI 500 Series in-line mixing console with outboard processing, including Neve 1061 microphone amps, Rockfield's original Rosser Electronics microphone amps, API 550 equalisers, and UREI 1176 compressors.

In the early days The Quadrangle was used by a new group, Queen, who recorded "Killer Queen" there for the album Sheer Heart Attack (1974), later using the space for recording A Night at the Opera in 1975, including their hit single "Bohemian Rhapsody". The Quadrangle has also hosted notable artists such as Rush, Manic Street Preachers, Robert Plant, and Coldplay.

== History ==
=== Background and early history ===
The Ward family bought Amberley Court Farm in Rockfield, originally a Shire horse breeding centre, in the early 1950s and ran it as a livestock farm with 500 pigs and a herd of dairy cows. Brothers Kingsley and Charles Ward were educated at Abergavenny Grammar School. Charles liked the early rock and roll music of Elvis Presley and began playing an acoustic guitar that he had purchased for £5. In 1960 the brothers formed a band, the Charles Kingsley Combo, and Kingsley wrote songs which they recorded on a tape deck borrowed from a local businessman. The brothers decided to pursue a record deal and drove to EMI's pressing plant in Middlesex, London, where they were redirected to the label's offices in Manchester Square. That day, without an appointment, they met producer George Martin. He did not sign the brothers, but said the reason he arranged a meeting was that they were the first artists he had seen bring a portable reel-to-reel tape deck with them.

The Ward brothers returned to London the following year and met producer Joe Meek at his studio. Meek signed them, and the brothers recorded songs as The Charles Kingsley Creation and as The Thunderbolts. After observing Meek's studio techniques, they set up a recording studio of their own in an attic space at Rockfield with a Rosser Electronics mixing console and a Ferrograph tape machine. In 1961 the brothers began recording local bands in their studio, which they named Future Sounds Ltd, charging £5 per acetate.

=== Early success ===
Rockfield (Studios) was an absolute dream because it was pastoral, funny and had a fantastic musical history ... I moved here and became one of these dismal, happy, sad, failed musicians that other people cross the street to avoid ... I really enjoyed my being in this Rockfield environment. I had lived in this goldfish bowl in Led Zeppelin.

— Robert Plant

In 1963 the Ward brothers converted an existing farmhouse building into a recording studio. They invested in an 8-track tape deck and lined the studio with feed bags for sound deadening. In 1965 they made Rockfield the world's first residential studio, enabling bands and artists to live on the premises and stay in peaceful rural surroundings while they were recording.

The first big hit recorded in the studios was Dave Edmunds' "I Hear You Knocking" in 1970. In the early 1970s, the studios were used to record seven albums by Budgie, several by Hawkwind, one by Hobo, Peter Hammill's second solo album Chameleon in the Shadow of the Night in 1973, Ace's hit single "How Long" in 1974, and Queen's album Sheer Heart Attack. Queen worked on developing their album A Night at the Opera and the song "Bohemian Rhapsody" for a month at Ridge Farm Studio, during the summer of 1975, before moving to Rockfield in August 1975 to begin recording the album, which became their first Platinum-selling album in the US. Motörhead made their first recordings at the studios in 1975 and were briefly signed to the Rockfield record label. Cyril Jordan of the Flamin' Groovies (who recorded at Rockfield several times between 1972 and 1978) said in 2014, "We thought Rockfield was the new Sun recording studios."

=== Later developments ===
As trends moved from the rock music of the 1970s and 1980s to the electronic music of the 1990s, which made greater use of technology and could almost be produced from a bedroom, there was less need for studio space and complex analogue recording systems. Rockfield was also facing competition, with many of the main recording labels creating their own residential recording studios, such as Virgin's "The Manor". The Rockfield company was struggling and the Ward brothers decided to split the farm. Kingsley retained the Rockfield half and Charles refurbished a semi-derelict manor house on the opposite side of the valley to create Monnow Valley Studio.

In financial difficulties, and with his wife Anne working full-time as a book keeper, Kingsley was approached by friend and record producer John Leckie to record the first album of Manchester band The Stone Roses. The band was resident for 14 months in 1988-89 recording their first and second albums and saved the studio. Their residency attracted recording sessions from other bands, including Oasis. During a 12-month period in 1996–97, Rockfield sessions resulted in five UK number one albums, by Oasis, Ash, Black Grape, The Charlatans and The Boo Radleys. In July 2020 the documentary Rockfield: The Studio on the Farm, directed by Hannah Berryman, was broadcast by BBC Four.

Charles Ward died on 27 July 2022.

== Artist roster ==
=== 1960s ===
- Doc Thomas Band (Mott the Hoople)

=== 1970s ===
- Clover
- Peter Hammill
- Motörhead
- Queen
- Van der Graaf Generator

=== 1980s ===
- Robert Plant
- Simple Minds
- T'Pau

=== 1990s ===
- Ash
- Aztec Camera
- Black Grape
- The Boo Radleys
- The Charlatans
- Julian Lennon
- Lush
- Oasis
- The Stone Roses

=== 2000s ===
- The Proclaimers
- Super Furry Animals
- Supergrass

=== 2010s/2020s ===
- Steve Harley
