= Empirical Labs Distressor =

Audio compressor

EL8 Distressor
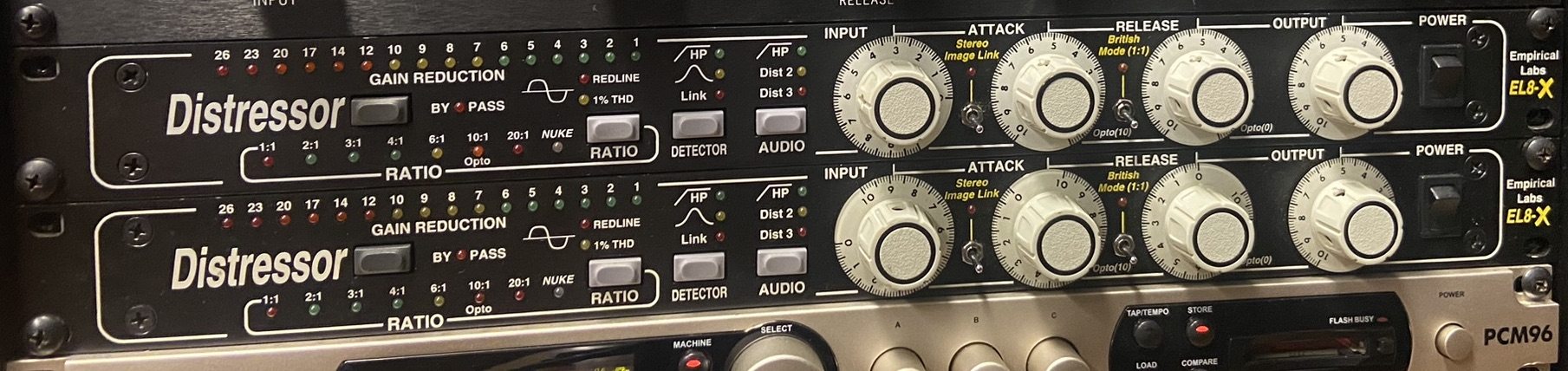
- Two EL8-X Distressors
- Manufacturer: Empirical Labs
- Dates: 1995—present

Technical specifications
- Effects type: Compression; Distortion
- Hardware: Analog
- Bypass: Yes
- Filter: High-pass

Controls

Input/output
- Inputs: 1
- Outputs: 1

The Empirical Labs EL8 Distressor Compressor/Limiter is an audio compression unit designed by Dave Derr and first sold in 1995. The name is a portmanteau of distortion and compressor.

The Distressor was inducted into the TECnology Hall of Fame in 2016 and has sold an estimated 40,000 units. Universal Audio, Slate Digital, and Softube all make software emulations of the Distressor.

== Design ==
The Distressor is an analog VCA compressor with a soft knee and a fixed threshold. Its ratio, attack and release times, and input and output gain are all variable. The device has built-in options for tube and tape distortion emulation and high-pass filtering, as well as a built-in side-chain allowing for the compressed signal (but not the output) to be high-passed, boosted at 6 kilohertz, and/or linked to another unit to operate in stereo. When set to a 10:1 ratio, it runs the signal through a separate circuit designed to emulate an optical compressor that uses photoresistors. The EL8-X model comes with additional switches for "Image Link", which causes a linked stereo pair of Distressors to have identical gain reduction, and "British Mode", which emulates a specific setting on the 1176 Peak Limiter.

== History ==
=== Dave Derr ===
Dave Derr grew up in a "family of engineers" and studied music in college. He spent twelve years playing in a band in Philadelphia after graduating, then worked as an electronics technician for a medical company. In 1986, he left the company to work as an engineer at Eventide, where he helped design their H3000 effects unit. He left Eventide after nine years to work at his own studio in Garfield, New Jersey and started designing the Distressor, being inspired to make his own compression unit after hearing how much his 1176 Peak Limiter and LA-2A Leveling Amplifier improved his recordings.

=== Distressor ===
Derr sold the first Distressor units in 1995 and founded Empirical Labs in 1996. The unit initially sold poorly but gained traction after getting a positive review in Mix magazine and being used by the sound engineers George Massenburg and Mutt Lange. It also received positive reviews in Sound on Sound and Tape Op magazines, with the former writing that "if you're one of those people who believe only tube technology can deliver the true classic sound, a few minutes spent using the Distressor might cause you to rethink your position" and the latter calling it "the best thing to happen to compression in the last twenty years". By 2003, Tape Op wrote that "[i]n many a studio the Empirical Labs Distressor is as much a common sight — and sound — as a guitar amp or coffee machine."

In 2016, the Distressor was inducted into the TECnology Hall of Fame. In 2022, it was estimated to have sold 40,000 units. In 2018, Universal Audio released a digital emulation of the Distressor.

== Uses ==
Some notable uses of the Distressor include the vocals on Maroon 5's "This Love" and Shawn Mendes' "Treat You Better", the bass on Kali Uchis' "Fantasy" and Wilco's Sky Blue Sky, and the drums on Idles' Crawler. The audio engineers Michael Brauer, Joe Chiccarelli, Fabian Marasciullo, and Robert Orton all use it in parallel on drums. The producer F. Reid Shippen wrote that "I cannot live without [the Distressor] on electric guitars, period." Derr himself also uses it on percussion, tambourine, and grand piano.
