= Universal Audio (company) =

American audio equipment manufacturer

Universal Audio, Inc.
- Type: Privately held company
- Industry: Pro Audio
- Founded: 1958; 68 years ago
- Founder: Bill Putnam Sr
- Defunct: 1970's, revived in 1999
- Headquarters: Scotts Valley, California, United States
- Key people: Bill Putnam Jr. (CEO); Dana Ruzicka (COO); Dan Morton (CPO)
- Products: Audio interface; Audio plug-in; Effect pedal; Digital audio workstation; Hardware accelerator; Microphone; Outboard gear
- Owner: Bill Putnam, Jr.
- Number of employees: 201-500
- Website: http://www.uaudio.com/

Universal Audio is an American company that designs, imports, and markets audio signal processing hardware and effect pedals, audio interfaces, digital signal processing, virtual instruments, and digital audio workstation software and plug-ins.

Founded in 1958 by Bill Putnam, Sr. with products produced under the Universal Audio brand through the mid-1970s, the company was re-established in 1999 by his sons Jim and Bill Putnam, Jr.. The company produces modern versions of vintage Universal Audio, UREI, and Teletronix analog recording equipment, as well as hardware and software for digital recording on the UAD-2 platform.

== History ==
=== Original company ===
Universal Audio, Inc. was founded alongside the United Recording Corporation by Bill Putnam Sr. in 1958. Putnam’s intention was for Universal Audio to serve as United’s manufacturing arm, with the company initially operating out of the United Recording premises at 6050 Sunset Boulevard in Hollywood, California. During its first few years, Universal Audio produced a number of tube-based audio processors, the most famous being the 610 preamplifier. These processors also served as components in custom recording consoles built by Universal Audio for various studios.

In 1961, United Recording acquired Studio Supply Co. and rebranded it as the Studio Electronics Corporation (SEC). The focus of SEC was the creation of fully-fledged studio systems built around the equipment produced by Universal Audio. In October 1961, all manufacturing was moved to Western Recorders, a nearby company in which United Recording had gained a majority stake.

While Universal Audio as a company was eventually absorbed by Studio Electronics in December 1965, the brand itself continued with individual products retaining the Universal Audio label. This merger also coincided with another relocation, this time to an 8,100 square foot premises at 11922 Valerio Street in North Hollywood.

Studio Electronics acquired two additional brands in 1967: Teletronix and Waveforms. The acquisition of Teletronix from Babcock allowed SEC to begin production of the popular LA-2A leveling amplifier. Waveforms on the other hand expanded the product catalog into the area of precision audio test instruments. In light of these acquisitions, and anticipation of more, SEC was rebranded as United Recording Electronics Industries (UREI). Products would continue to carry their own brand names alongside the UREI badge until the mid-1970s, at which point the Universal Audio label was removed from Revision H of the 1176 compressor.

As part of Putnam's sale of United Western Recorders, UREI was acquired by JBL in 1984. JBL released a number of products, primarily equalizers, with the UREI label.

=== Revival ===
In 1999, Universal Audio (UA) was reestablished by Bill and Jim Putnam, the sons of Bill Putnam, Sr.. A software-based sister company, Kind of Loud Technologies, was also co-founded by Bill Putnam, Jr. and Jonathan Abel, who had met at Stanford University through the Center for Computer Research in Music and Acoustics. The two companies merged to offer both hardware re-issues of classic Universal Audio and Teletronix recording products, and virtual emulations of audio equipment from a range of manufacturers, including officially-branded emulations of original UA and Teletronix products.

== Products ==
The first product introduced by the re-established Universal Audio in 1999 was a re-issue of the 1176LN. The original design was reproduced and revised thanks to the extensive design notes left by Bill Putnam. The company subsequently re-issued an updated version of the Teletronix LA-2A.

UA introduced its line of Apollo audio interfaces in 2012. These interfaces offered onboard DSP that allowed signals to be monitored in realtime through UA plugins. Subsequent models of Apollo also incorporated a technology called Unison, which improved the authenticity of preamp emulations by matching both the impedance of the original hardware as well as its gain level "sweet spots".

At the 2020 NAMM Show, UA announced that it would expand its Console software into a fully-featured DAW called LUNA. The software will be freely available to owners of any interface (not only Apollo), and now is compatible with Mac OS and Windows.

In 2021, Universal Audio introduced Volt, a line of USB audio interfaces aimed at the home-studio market. The lineup spans five models, from the single-input Volt 1 to the four-input Volt 476, sharing 24-bit/192kHz converters and microphone preamps with a "Vintage" mode designed to emulate the sound of UA's classic 610 tube preamp.

== Awards ==
The company has won several TEC Award awards and a FutureMusic Platinum award along with a Technical Grammy Award in 2009.
