= Chris Lord-Alge =

American mix engineer (born 1963)

- Born: May 13, 1963 (age 63)
- Genres: Rock, pop
- Occupation: Mix engineer
- Years active: 1986–present
- Website: chrislordalge.com

Chris Lord-Alge (born May 13, 1963) is an American mix engineer. He is the brother of both Tom Lord-Alge and Jeff Lord-Alge, both of whom are also audio engineers. Chris and Tom are known for their abundant use of dynamic range compression for molding mixes that play well on small loudspeaker and FM broadcasting. Lord-Alge frequently collaborates with Howard Benson, who has produced the plurality of his mix discography.

== Career ==
Lord-Alge began his professional studio career as an assistant engineer at H&L Studios in New Jersey, before working as a staff engineer at Unique Recording Studios in New York City in the 1980s. While there, he earned recognition for mixing James Brown's Gravity album (which included the hit song "Living in America"), the Rocky IV soundtrack, Prince's Batman soundtrack, Joe Cocker's Unchain My Heart album, Chaka Khan's Destiny album, Carly Simon's Coming Around Again album, Tina Turner's Foreign Affair album and 12" remixes of Madonna's "La Isla Bonita", the Rolling Stones' "Too Much Blood", and Bruce Springsteen's "Dancing in the Dark", "Cover Me", and "Born in the U.S.A.". Lord-Alge moved to Los Angeles in 1988, by which point he was increasingly specializing in mixing. In 1989–1990, brothers Chris and Jeff Lord-Alge collaborated on the Oingo Boingo album Dark at the End of the Tunnel, with Jeff Lord-Alge and Bill Jackson recording and Chris Lord-Alge mixing.

Lord-Alge continued to mix for Turner throughout the 90's. During this time he also provided mixing services for Neil Diamond's Tennessee Moon. In 1997, he mixed Green Day's Nimrod, marking the beginning of a continued relationship with the band, mixing the Grammy-winning albums American Idiot (2004) and 21st Century Breakdown (2009).

In the 2000s, Lord-Alge worked with many pop-punk bands, mixing for Billy Talent, Simple Plan, and My Chemical Romance. In the 2010s, Lord-Alge mixed on Celine Dion's Loved Me Back to Life, her first album after a seven-year hiatus, as well as Muse's The 2nd Law, a foray into more electronic textures.

== Partnership with Waves Audio ==
In early 2010, Waves Audio released the "CLA Artist Signature Collection", a collection of six application-specific audio plug-ins for vocals, drums, bass, guitar and the last two of them called "unplugged" (designed for acoustic elements) and "effects" (a collection of six different effects). Waves had previously released a bundle of CLA-branded compressors, featuring the CLA-76 (UREI 1176LN), CLA-2A (Teletronix LA-2A) and CLA-3A (UREI LA-3A). These are among Lord-Alge's favorite dynamics units.

== List of Grammy Awards ==
Year	Work	Role	Award
2010	American Idiot: The Original Broadway Cast Recording	mixing/engineering	Best Musical Theater Album
2009	21st Century Breakdown	mixing engineer	Best Rock Album
2005	"Boulevard of Broken Dreams"	mixing engineer	Record of the Year
2004	All Things New	mixing engineer (tracks 1, 2, 5, 9, 10, 12)	Best Pop/Contemporary Gospel Album
2004	American Idiot	mixing engineer	Best Rock Album
