= Ocean Way Recording =

Recording studios

Coordinates: 34.09789°N 118.32131°W

- Industry: Recording studio
- Predecessor: United Western Recorders
- Founded: Los Angeles, United States (1984)
- Founder: Allen Sides (*1953)
- Defunct: 2015
- Fate: Sold
- Successor: Cello Studios; United Recording Studios
- Headquarters: Los Angeles, United States
- Number of locations: 5
- Area served: Sunset Boulevard
- Website: oceanwayrecording.com

Ocean Way Recording was a series of recording studios established by recording engineer and producer Allen Sides with locations in Los Angeles, Nashville, and Saint Barthélemy. Ocean Way Recording no longer operates recording facilities, but Ocean Way Nashville continues to operate under the ownership of Belmont University.

== History ==
=== Background ===
Sides opened his first studio in 1968, beneath Santa Monica's Pacific Ocean Park amusement park. In 1972, Ocean Way founder Allen Sides opened a studio he had built in a 3 1/2-car garage on Ocean Way in Santa Monica, California, for the purpose of demonstrating tri-amplified loudspeakers of his own design. In 1977, Sides, who had worked as a runner at United Western Recorders in the late 1960s, purchased enough equipment from Bill Putnam's company UREI to completely fill the garage space for just $6,000, attracting the attention of Putnam. Sides and Putnam became friends and business partners, and Putnam offered Sides exclusive rights to sell UREI and United Western Studios' surplus equipment, providing Sides and his studio with a wide variety of studio equipment.

=== Ocean Way Hollywood ===
In 1976, after the lease on Sides' garage studio was abruptly canceled, Putnam provided space at United Western Recorders, leasing United Studio B to Sides. Six years later, Sides lease at United Western expanded to include United Studio A. When Putnam sold his companies to Harman in 1984, Harman sold the Western building and its contents to Sides, who later also acquired the United building.

Sides renamed the United Western Studios complex Ocean Way Recording after the location of his former garage studio. Ocean Way Studios operated the two-building complex from 1985 until 1999, when the former Western Studios building at 6000 Sunset Boulevard was partitioned, sold, and renamed Cello Studios. In 2006, the studio again changed ownership, and has since been in operation as EastWest Studios.

Ocean Way Studios continued operations in the building at 6050 Sunset Boulevard until 2013, when it was sold to Hudson Pacific Properties. Since 2015 it has been known as United Recording Studios.

=== Ocean Way Nashville ===
In 1995, Sides and Gary Belz purchased the 1911 Church of the Advent, a 100-year old Brownstone church building in Nashville's Music Row district, converting it to open Ocean Way Nashville the following year. In 2001, Sides and Belz sold the studios to Belmont University for use by the Mike Curb College of Entertainment & Music Business (CEMB). The university continues to operate the commercial studios, while also utilizing them as hands-on classrooms to teach audio engineering. Belmont University maintains license of the Ocean Way name and Sides remains a consultant.

=== Other Ocean Way studios ===
The Ocean Way Studios Group also included Record One studios in Sherman Oaks, California, which was acquired by Sides in 1988, and another Ocean Way Studio location in Saint Barthélemy.

Ocean Way Recording no longer operates recording facilities.

== Other Ocean Way companies ==
Sides is also the founder of Ocean Way Audio, a manufacturer of speaker systems. Ocean Way Drums, a partnership between Sides and producer Steven Miller, produces virtual instrument software.

== See also ==
- United Western Recorders
- EastWest Studios
