= Bill Putnam =

American musician and engineer

- Born: Milton Tasker Putnam; February 20, 1920; Danville, Illinois, U.S.
- Died: April 13, 1989 (aged 69) Riverside, California, U.S.
- Occupations: Audio engineer, songwriter, record producer

Milton Tasker "Bill" Putnam (February 20, 1920 – April 13, 1989) was an American audio engineer, songwriter, producer, studio designer, and businessman. He has been described as "the father of modern recording". He was the inventor of the modern recording console and is recognized as having been a key figure in the development of the postwar commercial recording industry.

Former colleague Bruce Swedien described Putnam's achievements:

"Bill Putnam was the father of recording as we know it today. The processes and designs which we take for granted — the design of modern recording desks, the way components are laid out and the way they function, console design, cue sends, multitrack switching — they all originated in Bill's imagination."

== Early life and education ==
Bill Putnam was born on February 20, 1920 in Danville, Illinois. Putnam's father owned several business enterprises related to the coal mining business and also ran a radio program at WDZ in Tuscola, Illinois. While in the Boy Scouts, working toward a 'wireless' merit badge, Bill built a crystal radio and a one-tube radio with his father's help, sparking his love of electronics. At thirteen, he tried and failed to become a licensed ham radio operator but at fifteen he succeeded, earning a Class B call sign W9PUK and building his own ham radio.

Bill Putnam attended Danville High School, where two of his school classmates were Dick Van Dyke and Bobby Short. In his early high school years, he worked part time in a friend's radio shop, learning about radio repair and PA systems. He began singing with a number of regional bands which played college campus gigs, developing his interest in jazz and the music business. He realized that musicians were his favorite people. By his junior year, Putnam was earning $5 per night singing with dance bands and owned his own ham radio shop where he also installed car radios on weekends. After Putnam graduated from high school, he sold his radio shop for $700 and decided to study broadcast engineering at Valparaiso Technical Institute; his professors were J.B. Hershmann and the school's future dean, Cloid Patton.

Putnam returned to his hometown of Danville to work in the engineering department at WDAN, and later became the chief engineer at WDWS in Champaign, Illinois. He began writing articles for Radio and Television magazine.

== Career ==
=== Military service ===
In 1941 at the age of 21, Putnam received a draft notice and became a civil service employee working on radio ranges for the United States Army Corps of Engineers under the Sixth Service Command in Chicago. He later worked for G-2 on several different projects, the first one was miniaturizing mine detectors to develop a miniature, concealable gun detector used by the United States Secret Service to protect President Franklin D. Roosevelt at the Tehran Conference. Putnam also worked for the Armed Forces Network to record big bands.

=== Illinois (1946–1957) ===
In 1946, Putnam founded Universal Recording Corporation in Evanston, Illinois to pursue the development of specialized recording equipment and new recording techniques. He secured a lucrative contract to record and delay broadcast transcriptions shows for the ABC radio network.

In 1947, Putnam moved Universal Recording to the 42nd floor of the Chicago Civic Opera Building striking a deal with The Harmonicats to help facilitate a recording session and record release in exchange for a portion of the sales of the record. His use of the building's bathroom as an echo chamber for the recording of Peg o' My Heart was the first artistic use of artificial reverb in a popular song. The song sold 1.4 million copies, inspiring Putnam to establish the Vitacoustic and Universal Records labels and attracted new clients to record with Putnam at Universal Recording.

In the same year, Putnam made the first recording of a single artist singing more than one line on a recording; it was recorded with Patti Page and George Barnes, who suggested the "duet." Page sang one vocal line of "Confess" and the second part was recorded onto a large 17.25" disc, then played back as she sang the main vocal line; the two vocals and accompaniment were wedded onto a wire recorder. Shortly thereafter, Les Paul utilized his own technique for multiplying guitars and vocals, using magnetic tape.

In 1955, Putnam built Universal Recording a new 15,000 square foot facility at 46 E. Walton Street. His company quickly became Chicago's largest independent studio, sometimes referred to as the "grand palace," recording projects for independent Chicago record labels like Vee-Jay, Mercury, Chess, and One-derful. His reputation grew quickly thanks to his work with artists such as Count Basie, Sarah Vaughan, Little Walter, Dinah Washington, Vic Damone, and Duke Ellington, who said Putnam was his favorite engineer.

There were a number of 'firsts' for the recording industry during Putnam's time at Universal Recording including the first use of tape repeat, the first vocal booth, the first multiple voice recording, one of the first to use 8-track recording (preceded by Les Paul and Tom Dowd), the first use of delay lines in the studio, and the first release (in 1956) of half-speed mastered discs (on the Mercury label.)

By the mid-1950s, Putnam was one of the most sought-after engineer-producers in the United States. Sam Phillips sent Elvis Presley's "Mystery Train" and "I Forgot to Remember to Forget" to Putnam in August, 1955 with the instructions: "Give me 'hot' level on both 78 and 45's and as much presence peak and bass as possible!" Universal Recording had become so successful that clients including Nelson Riddle, Mitch Miller, and Quincy Jones began urging Putnam to open a facility on the west coast.

=== California ===
In 1957, with support from Frank Sinatra and Bing Crosby, Putnam sold his interest in Universal Recording and moved to Hollywood, taking over and remodeling a defunct film studio at 6050 Sunset Boulevard establishing a new company, United Recording.

Determined to incorporate as many technological innovations into the new complex as possible, Putnam constructed new facilities, including a significant modernization of studio control room concept to permit multi-track monitoring and recording. It featured his innovative design to provide overhead forward speaker mounting and provided seating space for guests while improving the engineer's view of the studio (control rooms of the era had typically been small booths). United's facilities included three acoustically isolated studios of varying sizes, three lacquer mastering studios (one stereo) and a stereo re-mixing room. Additionally each studio had its own stereo acoustic reverberation room. All facilities were cross connected electronically at a central location and all facilities were available to each other as needed.

In 1961, Putnam acquired the neighboring Western Recorders located at 6000 Sunset, remodeled it, and incorporated it into the complex which was renamed United Western Recorders. He was Frank Sinatra's preferred engineer, and Sinatra put him on retainer to ensure his availability. When Sinatra founded Reprise Records, his office was in the Western Recorders building.

At the time Putnam started United Recording, stereo recording was new and considered by the major record labels as little more than a novelty. But he foresaw its importance and at his own expense, began making and stockpiling simultaneous stereo mixes of recordings produced at United. About 1962, as consumer demand for stereo recordings was surging, the major labels offered to buy Putnam's stockpile of stereo recordings. He negotiated a lucrative deal, whereby he was recompensed not for the finished recordings, but for the (much more expensive) studio time used in mixing the stereo versions. According to his former associate, Allen Sides, at this time United Recording was bringing in around $200,000 per month in studio billing (equivalent to $2.13 million per month today).

After the United/Western merger and at the request of several film music producers in Hollywood who were looking for a more modern sound for their films, the studios began to record film scores utilizing multi-track film recorders. Playing video cues and sync recording mono audio for quick playback in the studio was also a very popular time saver.

In 1962, sensing a business opportunity in the Bay Area's commercial jingle industry, Putnam purchased a majority interest in Coast Recorders and moved the studio to a location at 960 Bush Street. He eventually relocated Coast Recorders to a two-floor studio complex of his own design at 827 Folsom Street, where Francis Ford Coppola leased space on the second floor for his American Zoetrope film studio. Less than a year later on September 15, 1970, Putnam sold majority control of the building to Columbia Records, a division of CBS. The location later became the home of The Automatt recording studio.

In 1963, Putnam extended his studio presence to Las Vegas when he established United Recording Corporation of Nevada, or URCON, complete with a fully-equipped remote recording truck. In 1966, Putnam sold URCON to Bill Porter.

In 1985, Putnam sold the original United Recording studio to Allen Sides, who renamed it Ocean Way Recording.

=== Universal Audio and UREI ===
Putnam developed the first US multi-band audio equalizer and established Universal Audio as well as Universal Recording Electronics Industries (UREI) in the second story loft of United Recording, in 1958 as a means to develop and manufacture studio equipment. That included custom Studio Electronics recording consoles, outfitted with Putnam's 610 modular channel strips, all of which soon became standard equipment in studios all over America. His companies were also responsible for the vacuum tube-based LA-2A and 176 compressors, and their transistor based successors, the LA-3A and 1176. They also developed the Time Align Monitor Series.

UREI outgrew the loft above United Recording and relocated to a wing of the Western Recorders building, later moving again to a much larger headquarters in North Hollywood, with Putnam eventually selling it to Harman Industries.

== Personal life ==
Putnam was married four times. He and his first wife Grace had a son and daughter, Scott and Sue; Grace elected to stay in Danville, Illinois with their children when Bill joined the U.S. Army Band and was stationed near the North Side of Chicago. After his discharge from the Army he and Grace divorced. After Universal Recording moved to Walton Street, Bill met Belinda Richmond, a singer at a nearby club near Universal Recording Corp's Walton Street location and the two were married. Richmond worked at the studios as a tape editor and part time file librarian. But after moving to Hollywood, Putnam's long hours at Universal Recording again led to a divorce. Frank Sinatra introduced Putnam to his assistant, Miriam Simons (also known as 'Tookie'), who became his third wife; Bill and Miriam had two sons, Bill Jr. and Jim. Miriam died unexpectedly and Bill did not marry again until after he sold the company and retired. In retirement he and his last wife, Caroline, moved to Ventura Keys, California.

Bill Putnam died in Riverside, California at the age of 69; he was laid to rest in Valley Oaks Memorial Park in Westlake Village. Many record executives and industry colleagues attended the service and a group of musicians formed a band to play some of his favorite songs.

== Awards ==
- The Audio Engineering Society awarded Putnam a Fellowship Award in 1959, and an Honorary Membership in 1983 "for lifelong contributions to studio design and to the design and making of audio instruments and equipment."
- In 2000, Putnam received a posthumous Special Merit/Technical Grammy Award for his contribution to the music industry.
