= Ducking =

Audio effect

In audio engineering, ducking is an audio effect commonly used in radio and pop music, especially dance music. In ducking, the level of one audio signal is reduced by the presence of another signal. In radio this can typically be achieved by lowering (ducking) the volume of a secondary audio track when the primary track starts, and lifting the volume again when the primary track is finished. A typical use of this effect in a daily radio production routine is for creating a voice-over: a foreign language original sound is dubbed (and ducked) by a professional speaker reading the translation. Ducking becomes active as soon as the translation starts.

In music, the ducking effect is applied in more sophisticated ways where a signal's volume is delicately lowered by another signal's presence. Ducking here works through the use of a "side chain" gate. In other words, one track is made quieter (the ducked track) whenever another (the ducking track) gets louder. This may be done with a gate with its ducking function engaged or by a dedicated ducker.

A typical application is to achieve an impression similar to the "pumping" effect. The difference between ducking and side-chain pumping is that in ducking the attenuation is by a specific range while side-chain compression creates variable attenuation. Ducking may be used in place of mirrored equalization to combat masking, for example with the bass guitar (or bass timbre from synth or other instruments) ducked under the kick drum, resembling subtle side-chain pumping. A ducking system may be created where one track ducks another, which ducks another, and so on. Examples include Portishead's "Biscuit".

Used most often to turn down the music when the DJ speaks, ducking may be used to combat the muffling and distancing effect of reverb and delay. The ducker is inserted into the reverb and delay line and keyed to a dry track to duck its own reverb and delay so that when the dry track exceeds the ducker's threshold by reaching a certain amplitude the reverb and delay are attenuated. Clear examples include Céline Dion's "The Power Of Love" where the reverb and delay become audible when Dion pauses; and Adele's "Cold Shoulder".
