= United Western Recorders =

Former recording studio complex in Hollywood, US

Coordinates: 34°5′52.19″N 118°19′13.49″W

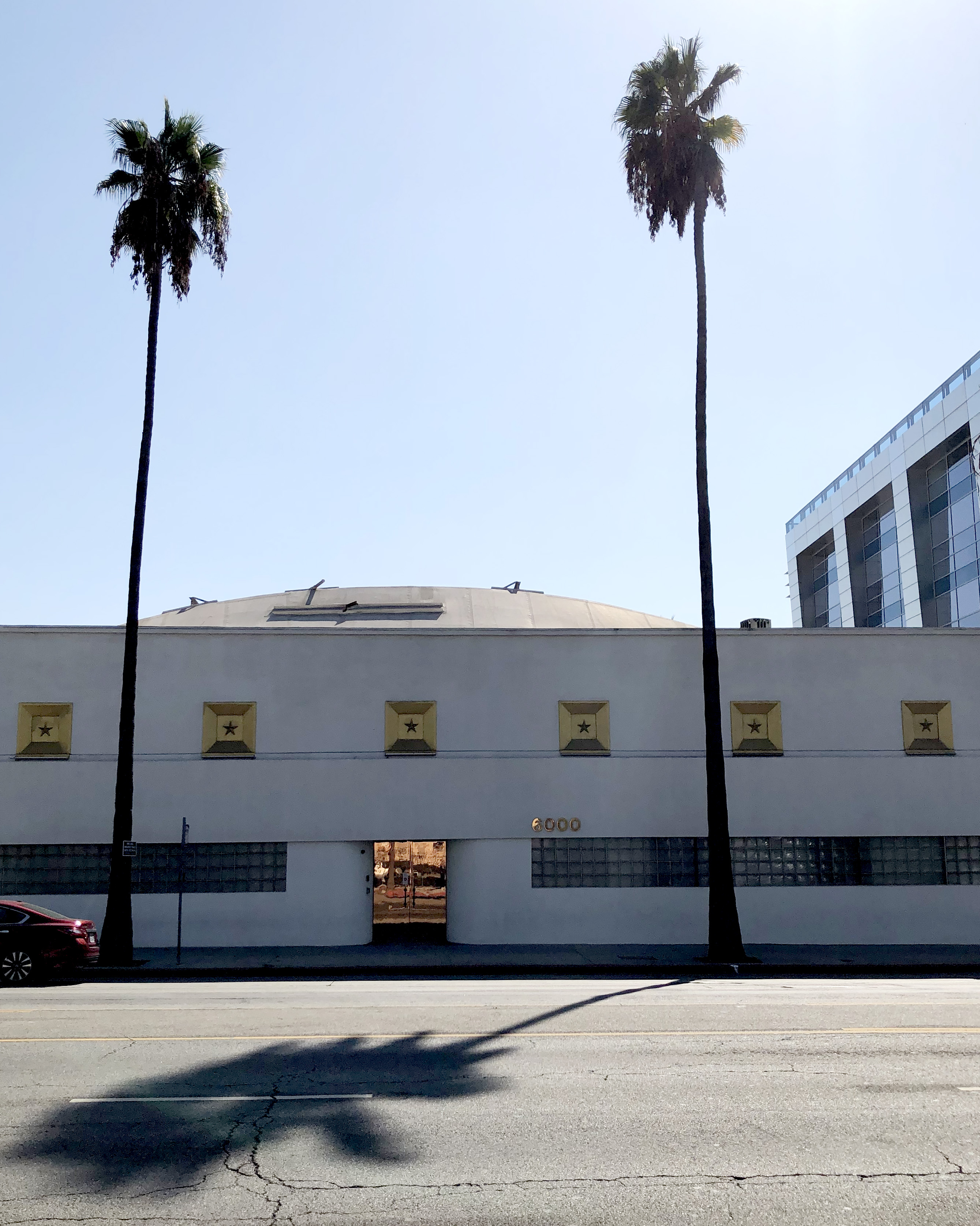
- 6000 Sunset Boulevard in 2019, the former site of Western Studio
- Industry: Recording studio
- Predecessor: United Recording Corp.; Western Studio
- Founded: 1961 in Los Angeles, California
- Founder: Bill Putnam
- Defunct: 1984
- Fate: Sold
- Successor: Ocean Way Recording; United Recording Studios
- Headquarters: Los Angeles, California, U.S.
- Number of locations: 2
- Website: www.sunsetstudios.com/united-recording/

United Western Recorders was a two-building recording studio complex in Hollywood that was one of the most successful independent recording studios of the 1960s. The complex merged neighboring studios United Recording Corp. on 6050 Sunset Boulevard and Western Studio on 6000 Sunset Boulevard.

In 1984, United Western Recorders was renamed and succeeded by Ocean Way Recording. Starting in 1999, the complex was divided into two establishments: Ocean Way Recording (now United Recording Studios) at 6050 Sunset and Cello Studios (now EastWest Studios) at 6000 Sunset.

Some of the biggest hits of the 1960s were recorded at United Western. According to the book Temples of Sound, "No other studio has won more technical excellence awards, and no studio has garnered as many Best Engineered Grammys". Western's Studio 3 is considered iconic for its use by Brian Wilson for the Beach Boys' albums Pet Sounds (1966) and Smile (unreleased).

== Structure ==
The complex's two buildings, United Recording and Western Studio, operated more or less independently despite being located only one block apart. United consisted of two large rooms; the larger United 'A' was approximately 45 ft × 65 ft × 22 ft (13.7 m × 19.8 m × 6.7 m), with United 'B' being slightly smaller. Western copied the layout of United, with the very large Western 1 and the somewhat smaller Western 2. Both buildings also had a third, smaller recording room, as well as several dubbing and mastering suites. The small rooms provided a sumptuous sound, with Western Studio 3, measuring just 34 ft × 15 ft (10.4 m × 4.6 m), being Brian Wilson's preference.

== History ==
=== Active years (1961–84) ===
Prior to his move to California, Bill Putnam had founded the Universal Recording Corporation studio in Chicago. A pioneer of modern recording technique, Putnam became known for his UREI recording equipment and custom-made Universal Audio mixing consoles, which were bought by major recording studios. After relocating to Hollywood in 1957, and with the backing of Bing Crosby and Frank Sinatra, Putnam first established the United Recording Corp. studio complex at 6050 Sunset Boulevard in Hollywood. By 1958, Studio B was completed, including two reverb chambers. The facility grew to three recording studios, three mastering rooms, a mixdown room and a small-scale record manufacturing plant. The new studios were booked around the clock, busy with TV and movie voiceovers and soundtrack recordings as well as with popular artist's recordings. Hanna-Barbera used the studios to record voices for The Flintstones; Ricky Nelson recorded Poor Little Fool, the first-ever Billboard Hot 100 No. 1 song in 1958 along albums such as Rick Is 21 (1961), which includes songs like "Hello Mary Lou" and "Travelin' Man".

In 1961, Putnam purchased the neighboring Western Studio at 6000 Sunset, remodeling and incorporating the building into the complex. The buildings were then renamed United Western Recorders, and catered to some of the biggest artists of the era, including Frank Sinatra, the Beach Boys, and Elvis Presley.

Putnam assembled a talented staff, some of whom became major names in their own right, such as Bones Howe, John Haeny, Lee Hershberg, Chuck Britz, and Wally Heider, one of the pioneers of mobile recording and later of Wally Heider Studios. United was initially favored by older artists such as Crosby, Sinatra, Nat King Cole, and Ray Charles, as well as the young Fleetwoods, while Western soon became a favored recording venue for the new generation of pop-rock musicians and producers, such as Sam Cooke, the Beach Boys, Phil Spector and the Mamas & the Papas.

In the early sixties, Putnam scored a significant coup when major US record labels began to release stereophonic recordings in large numbers. According to Allen Sides, when stereo first appeared in the late 1950s, the cost-conscious major labels were initially uninterested, feeling that the market for the new format was limited, and that stereo mixdowns were a waste of time and money. Putnam however foresaw the coming importance of stereo and, at his own expense, he began making simultaneous mono and stereo mixdowns, storing away the stereo versions of these recordings, which at the time were released only in mono. When stereo took off in the early sixties, Putnam had amassed a stockpile of more than two-and-a-half years' worth of stereo recordings by scores of major acts. The value of this stockpile can be estimated from Sides' statement that United Western was at this time bringing in around US$200,000 per month in studio billings—equivalent to perhaps US$1 million per month today. The major labels approached Putnam hoping to buy the stereo tape stockpile, but he struck a far more lucrative deal, in which the labels repaid him for the (far more expensive) studio time he had used in making the stereo mixes.

In 1970, Jack Herschorn purchased the Universal Audio mixing console and other pro audio equipment from that studio, including Universal Audio LA-76A and LA-76B limiting amplifiers, Universal Audio vacuum tube power amplifiers (which were actually Dynakit Stereo 70 and 50-watt mono amplifier kits assembled into rack-mount chassis), Fairchild Conax sibilance controllers, Langevin graphic equalizers and Cinema Engineering filters, all originally installed in United Studio A in 1957. Herschorn had this equipment installed under the supervision of Charlie Richmond at Herschorn's Aragon Studios in Vancouver, Canada. The studio would later become Mushroom Studios.

In 1982, Eddie Van Halen purchased the UA console from Western Studio 2 and installed it in his personal 5150 Studio. The Van Halen albums 1984, 5150, and OU812 were recorded using the console.

=== Management changes ===
==== Ocean Way Recording ====
In 1984, Putnam sold the studio complex to Allen Sides, who renamed the buildings Ocean Way Recording, as they would both be known until 1999.

==== Cello Studios ====
In 1999, Sides sold the Western half of the complex to computer magnate Rick Adams, who renamed it Cello Studios. Cello Studios operated at the 6000 Sunset complex from 1999 to 2005. During that period, the studios hosted high-profile rock artists such as Blink-182, Rage Against the Machine, Tool, System of a Down, Weezer, Muse, Red Hot Chili Peppers, Audioslave, and the Mars Volta. Cello Studios closed in 2005.

When Allen Sides sold Western to Rick Adams, the equipment inventory was also purchased from Ocean Way Recording, including a collection of rare vintage microphones, as well as vintage outboard gear including valuable studio effects units such as the Fairchild 670 limiters, no longer made, which were a crucial element of the sound of many classic pop recordings of the Fifties and Sixties. While the building was modified to accommodate the new facility's needs, the studios themselves have not been altered since Putnam's original design. During this period, the studio played host to artists such as Alanis Morissette, Natalie Merchant, Elton John, R.E.M., Bette Midler, Barenaked Ladies, Stone Temple Pilots, Matthew Sweet, Mötley Crüe, Green Day, Vonray and Blink-182.

==== EastWest Studios ====
At the beginning of 2006, Cello Studios (originally Western) was purchased by EastWest Sounds producer Doug Rogers and renamed EastWest Studios. Rogers extensively remodeled the non-technical areas of the studio complex with designer Philippe Starck, but the studios themselves, with their untouched acoustics, remain as originally built by Putnam in the 1960s and continue to operate to this day. Since 2012 EastWest Studios has racked up 130 Grammy nominations, more than any other recording studio in the world.

==== United Recording Studios ====
In 2013, Ocean Way Recording was sold to Hudson Pacific Properties, and in 2015 it was renamed back to United Recording Studios.

== Legacy ==
Frank Sinatra made his Reprise recordings—including hits like "It Was a Very Good Year", "That's Life"—in United A, and "Strangers in the Night"—in Western 1, and his Reprise records offices were located upstairs. Ray Charles cut his country-soul crossover hit "I Can't Stop Loving You" and the LP Modern Sounds in Country and Western Music at United B. As well as the classic Pet Sounds, Western 3 was the venue for the recording of many other chart-topping pop hits, including the Mamas & the Papas' "California Dreamin'" and "Monday, Monday", the Grass Roots' "Let's Live for Today" and "Midnight Confessions" and "Hair" by the Cowsills. As well as those mentioned above, other artists who have recorded there include Blondie, Elvis Presley, Bobby Vee, the 5th Dimension, the Righteous Brothers, Barbra Streisand, Petula Clark, Ella Fitzgerald, Whitney Houston, Dean Martin, Sammy Davis Jr., the Rolling Stones, Elton John, Tom Petty, R.E.M., k.d. lang, Madonna, Rod Stewart, Glen Campbell, Eric Clapton, Bonnie Raitt and Walter Wanderley.

Many film and television theme songs have been recorded in the studios at 6000 Sunset. The theme songs for Hawaii Five-O, The Partridge Family, The Beverly Hillbillies, and Green Acres were all recorded at Western Recorders.

== See also ==
- Universal Recording Corporation
- Ocean Way Recording
- EastWest Studios
