= Outboard gear =

External audio processing electronics

Musical outboard equipment or outboard gear is used to process or alter a sound signal separately from functionality provided within a mixing console or a digital audio workstation. Outboard effects units can be used either during a live performance or in the recording studio.

== Overview ==
Some outboard effects units and digital signal processing (DSP) boxes commonly found in a studio are:

- analog-to-digital and digital-to-analog converters
- musical instrument digital interfaces (MIDIs)
- microphone preamplifiers
- equalizers
- dynamics effects units: compressors/limiters, noise gates
- time-based effects units: reverb, flanging, delay, chorus etc.

== Devices ==
The term outboard was originally used to describe a piece of audio equipment that existed outside of a studio or venue's primary analog mixing board. Today, analog effects are also considered outboard when used in conjunction with console-free computer-based digital recording systems.

Famous examples include analog dynamic range compressors, such as the Teletronix LA-2A and the Universal Audio/UREI 1176, early multi-effects units like those made by Eventide, and physical or digital reverb processors invented by EMT and Lexicon.

== Vocal effects ==
Some units either introduce a reverberation effect or some kind of pitch transformation or coloration of the singer's voice. Digital units have been designed that can compress or expand the duration of sound; these alter the speed of length of the original sound.

== Digital units ==
The invention of the MIDI interfaced electronic keyboard has seen a leap forward in the way that the sound of musical instruments is produced on stage or in the recording studio. The modern keyboard produces digital signals when the keys are depressed; these signals are processed by external effects units to reproduce original digitally sampled instrument sounds, such as a classical piano or string and wind instruments. This allows the user of such a device to reproduce the sound of virtually any instrument.

== Etymology ==
The term outboard can be considered "out of board" or "not inside the board". When recording engineers / live sound technicians needed an external processor that was not a part of their mixing surface they would go "Outboard".
