= LA-2A Leveling Amplifier =

Audio compressor unit

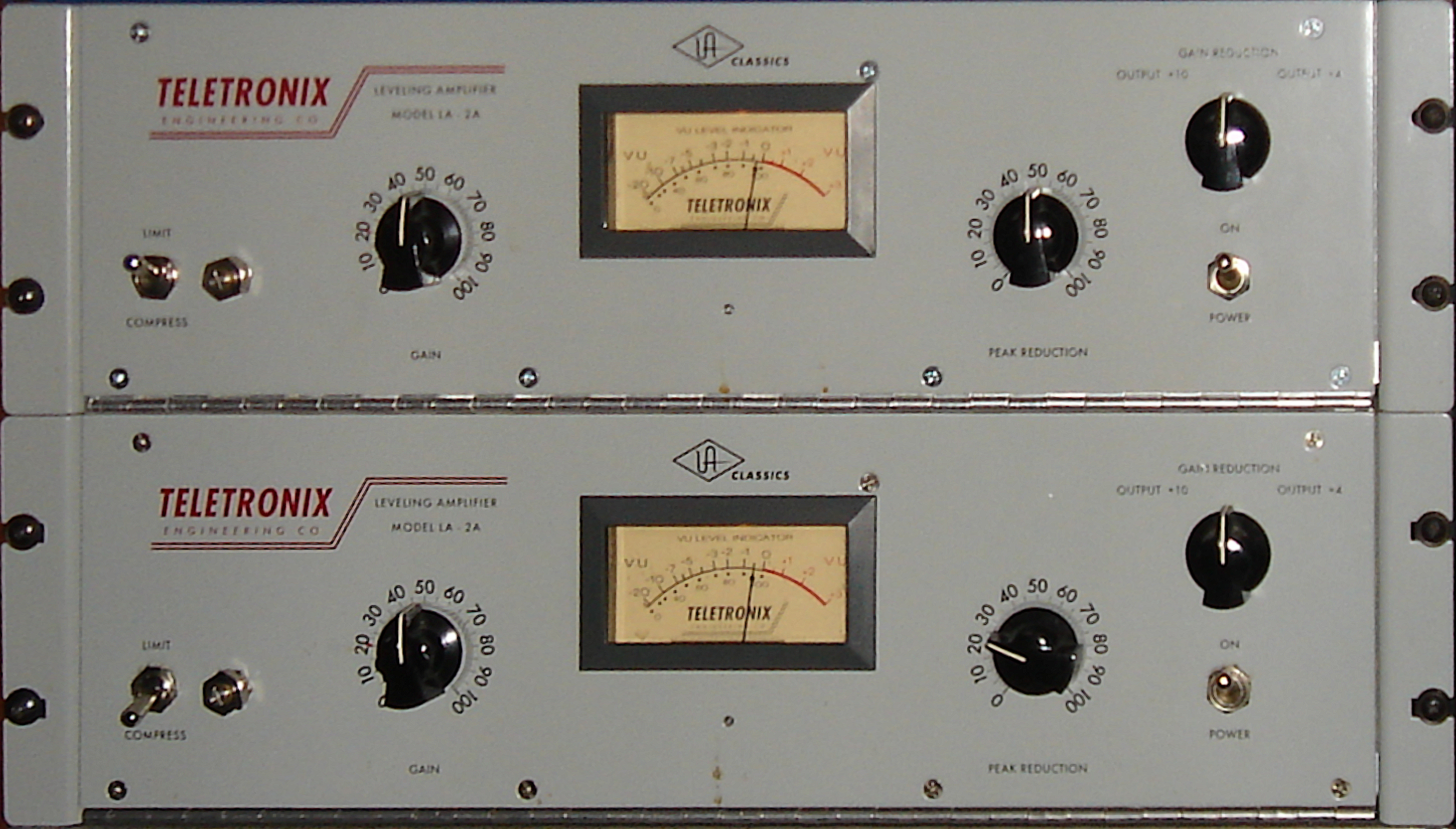
- Teletronix LA-2A Leveling Amplifiers
- Brand: Teletronix
- Manufacturer: Teletronix, Universal Audio
- Dates: 1962-1969; 1979; 1992; 1999-present

Technical specifications
- Effects type: Compressor
- Hardware: Analog

Controls

Input/output
- Inputs: 1
- Outputs: 1

The LA-2A Leveling Amplifier is an audio compressor produced by the Teletronix Engineering Company from 1962 until 1969 and since 1999 by Universal Audio.

== History ==
The LA-2A was invented by James F. Lawrence II, who had founded the Teletronix Engineering Company in 1958 in Pasadena, California. While working as an audio engineer at the Los Angeles radio station KMGM in the early 1950s, Lawrence became frustrated with the practice of operating faders in real time to maintain consistent audio levels, and sought to devise a "leveling amplifier" that would perform this task automatically. The LA-2A had evolved from Lawrence's first compressor, the LA-1 (which was favored by Gene Autry), and its successor, the LA-2, which had been adopted by CBS and RCA for both broadcast and recording applications.

The LA-2A was released commercially in 1962. In 1965, Lawrence sold Teletronix to Babcock Electronics of Costa Mesa, California, and in 1967 Bill Putnam's Studio Electronics (later renamed UREI) acquired Babcock's broadcast division, including the Teletronix brand. The LA-2A was revised twice before production ended in 1969 in favor of newer solid-state models.

Limited-edition reissues of the LA-2A were manufactured by UREI in 1979 and by Harman/JBL in 1992. In 1999, Putnam's sons established Universal Audio, and the company issued an updated version of the LA-2A that same year as one of its first products. The reissue was reviewed in Mix magazine the following year.

The LA-2A was inducted into the TECnology Hall of Fame in 2004.

== Design ==
The LA-2A is a hand-wired, vacuum tube-based compressor. It uses an electroluminescent panel which reacts to the level of incoming audio together with a cadmium sulfide photoresistor to provide gain reduction. This circuit, termed the "T4 cell", was derived from optical sensors that Lawrence had developed for the Titan missile program while working at the California Institute of Technology's Jet Propulsion Laboratory in the early 1950s.

The LA-2A has only two knobs and one switch to control the compression effect: a "Peak-Reduction" knob controls the gain of the side-chain circuit and therefore the amount of compression, a "Gain" knob controls make-up gain, and a "Limit/Compress" switch alters the compression ratio. The unit provides enough make-up gain (via a 12AX7 vacuum tube) that it can also be used as a preamplifier. The VU meter may be switched to show either the amount of gain reduction or the output level.

The average attack time is 10 milliseconds, while the release time is about 60 ms for 50% release and 1 to 15 seconds for full release, depending on the previous program material.

== In use ==
The LA-2A has the ability to preserve the impression of performance dynamics while performing extreme compression. This makes it sought after by many recording engineers, particularly for use on vocals and bass guitar.

Recording engineers who cite the LA-2A in their work include Joe Barresi, Mike Clink, and Tony Maserati. The LA-2A was used to record Alanis Morissette's vocals on her 1995 album Jagged Little Pill, Kurt Cobain's vocals on Nirvana's 1991 album Nevermind, and Shakira's vocals on her 2006 single "Hips Don't Lie". Producer Joe Chiccarelli used an LA-2A to add distortion to Jack White's vocals on the White Stripes' 2007 album Icky Thump.

LA-2As warm things up. ...they EQ all the warmth and low mids and bass. When you put bass and drums in them they get fatter and bigger. And unless you hit them way hard and make the tubes sizzle they don't really distort.

— Jim Scott

== Software emulations ==
Universal Audio has offered an official LA-2A software plug-in since 2002, when they included the first version with their UAD-1 Peripheral Component Interconnect DSP card. An updated version was introduced in 2013, when UA released the "LA-2A Classic Leveler Collection" for the UAD-2 DSP platform, which included plug-ins modeling the late-1960s "Silver" revision of the LA-2A, the mid-1960s "Gray" version, and the earlier LA-2.

Bomb Factory Digital released an emulation of the LA-2 as part of their "Classic Compressors for Pro Tools" plug-in bundle, since re-branded as the Avid BF-2A. Waves Audio has released the CLA-2A plug-in, an emulation of the LA-2A with presets by engineer Chris Lord-Alge. Other plug-in adaptations of the LA-2A include the Cakewalk CA-2A, IK Multimedia T-RackS White 2A, and Native Instruments/Softube VC 2A.

== See also ==
- 1176 Peak Limiter
- Empirical Labs Distressor
