= De-essing =

Audio technique that reduces the prominence of sibilance

De-essing (also desibilizing) is any technique intended to reduce or eliminate the excessive prominence of sibilant consonants, such as the sounds normally represented in English by "s", "z", "ch", "j", "t" and "sh", in recordings of the human voice. Sibilance lies in frequencies anywhere between 2 and 10 kHz, depending on the individual voice.

== History ==
De-essing originated in 1939 at Warner Bros. for film soundtracks. In the 1960s, Ortofon used treble limiting in vinyl cutting. The 1970s saw the first dedicated units like the Orban 516EC. The dbx 902, released in 1980, became a studio standard and shaped modern designs.

== Causes of excess sibilance ==
Excess sibilance can be caused by compression, microphone choice and technique, and even simply the way a person's mouth anatomy is shaped. Ess sound frequencies can be irritating to the ear, especially with earbuds or headphones, and interfere with an otherwise modulated and pleasant audio stream.

== Process ==
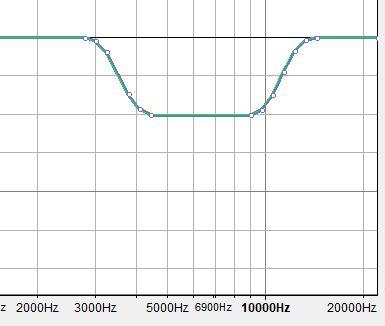
Equalization curve lowering the decibels of an ess frequency range for a human voice

De-essing is a dynamic audio editing process, only working when the level of the signal in the sibilant range (the ess sound) exceeds a set threshold. De-essing temporarily reduces the level of high-frequency content in the signal when a sibilant ess sound is present. De-essing differs from equalization, which is a static change in level among many frequencies. However, equalization of the ess frequencies alone can be manipulated to reduce the level of sibilance.

There are several time- and frequency-based algorithms that can reduce sibilance or de-ess the sound. Time-domain approaches, such as bandpass filters, are more suited to real-time applications such as live radio due to fewer constraints on digital signal processing. Playback or offline applications incorporate methods based on the fast Fourier transform (FFT).

=== Using a dedicated plugin ===
In the current digital stronghold of audio production, the most commonly used tool for reducing sibilance is a de-esser plugin. A dynamic equalizer can be used to achieve the same effects as a de-esser; however, plugin manufacturers have tailored these tools to operate efficiently within the mid-high to high frequencies.

A de-essing plugin will compress the desired signal according to the amplitude of the selected frequency as it passes over a preset threshold. In the case of excessive sibilance, anywhere from 4 to 10 kHz will often be where the problem resides. Certain plugins will shape the envelope of the compression to achieve a more musical effect.

Over de-essing can result in the over-manipulation of transients, resulting in the softening or hardening of certain consonants, yielding undesirable effects.

=== Side-chain compression or broadband de-essing ===
Broadband de-essing using bandpass filtered side-chain

With this technique, the signal feeding the side-chain of a dynamic-range compressor is equalized or filtered so that the sibilant frequencies are most prominent. As a result, the compressor only reduces the level of the signal when there is a high level of sibilance. This reduces the level over the entire frequency range. Because of this, attack and release times are extremely important, and threshold settings cannot be placed as low as with other types of de-essing techniques without experiencing more blatant sound artifacts.

=== Split-band compression ===
Split-band de-essing

Here, the signal is split into two frequency ranges: a range that contains the sibilant frequencies, and a range that does not. The signal containing the sibilant frequencies is sent to a compressor. The other frequency range is not processed. Finally the two frequency ranges are combined back into one signal.

The original signal can either be split into high (sibilant) and low frequencies, or split so that the frequencies both below and above the sibilance are untouched. This technique is similar to multi-band compression.

=== Dynamic equalization ===
Dynamic-equalization de-essing

The gain of a parametric equalizer is reduced as the level of the sibilance increases. The frequency range of the equalizer is centered on the sibilant frequencies.

=== With automation ===
A more recent method of de-essing involves automation of the vocal level in a digital audio workstation (DAW). Whenever problematic sibilance occurs, the level can be set to follow automation curves that are manually drawn in by the user.

This method is made feasible by editing automation points directly, as opposed to programming by manipulating gain sliders in a write mode. An audio engineer would not be able to react fast enough to precisely reduce and restore vocal levels for the brief duration of sibilants during real-time playback.

=== Without automation or with manual equalization ===
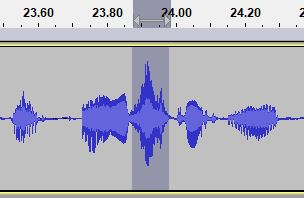
The ess in the spoken word "instantly" highlighted in the waveform display of a digital audio workstation

Audio editing software, whether professional or amateur software such as Audacity, can use the built-in equalization effects to reduce or eliminate sibilant ess sounds that interfere with a recording. Described here is a common method with Audacity. The process is in two phases:

1. Analyze the frequency of the voice's ess sound by sampling several instances and calculating the range of ess frequencies. Typically, sibilance frequency range lies within 3–6 kHz for male voices and 6–8 kHz for female voices.
2. Apply an equalization filter to quiet the determined frequency band by −4 dB to −11 dB during ess-frequency time events.

The rise and fall time of the filter should be fast (less than 10 ms) in order to clip the sibilance-specific instances only.

== See also ==
- Audio editing software
- Audio Engineering Society
- Audio signal
- Equalization (audio)
- Psychoacoustics
- Sound editing
- Sound energy density level
- Sound engineer
- Sound intensity
- Sound recording and reproduction
