= Universal Recording Corporation =

Chicago recording studio (1946–1989)

Coordinates: 41.88471°N 87.62906°W

Universal Recording Corp.
- Industry: Recording studio
- Founded: Evanston, Illinois, U.S. (1946)
- Founder: Bill Putnam, Sr.
- Defunct: 1989
- Headquarters: Chicago, Illinois, U.S.

Universal Recording Corporation was a recording studio in Chicago founded by Bill Putnam Sr. for the purpose of investigating new recording techniques and the development of specialized recording equipment.

Universal Recording was seminal in the development of experimental studio techniques. It was the location of the first use of tape repeat in a recording, the first isolated vocal booth, the first recording with multiple overdubs of a single voice, early eight-track recording trials and the first experiments with half speed disc mastering.

== History ==
=== Early history ===
Putnam established Universal Recording Corp. north of Downtown Chicago in Evanston, Illinois, in 1946. His partners were Bernie Clapper (a former Valparaiso Technical Institute roommate) and Bob Weber (who Putnam had met while working with the U.S. Army). The initial investment, most of which Putnam had borrowed from his family, was $20,000. The Evanston facility consisted of one small studio with a Western Electric broadcast console and a Scully recording lathe with Westrex system purchased from Otto Hepp. Putnam won a lucrative contract with to record and delay broadcast transcriptions shows for the ABC radio network.

Recognizing the need for Universal Recording to have a location closer to downtown Chicago, Putnam took over the studios on the 42nd floor of the Chicago Civic Opera Building at 20 Wacker Drive in Chicago. He struck a deal with the Harmonicats to help facilitate a recording session and record release in exchange for a portion of the sales of the record. His use of the building's bathroom as an echo chamber for the recording of "Peg o' My Heart" was the first artistic use of artificial reverb in a popular song. The song sold 1.4 million copies and gave Universal Recording Corp. a big boost in income and new business.

Universal Recording soon became the hotspot for the Chicago music business. Such artists as Patti Page, Vic Damone and Dinah Washington came through the doors; Al Morgan's "Jealous Heart" sold a million copies on the in-house Universal Records label.

In 1949, Universal Recording was granted a patent for "Double Feature", a method for putting two songs on each side of a 10-inch record. The technology was developed by Cook Records in New York and exclusively licensed to Universal Records.

=== Walton Street ===
In 1955, Putnam built Universal Studios a new 15,000 square foot facility at 46 E. Walton Street. Putnam's company quickly became Chicago's largest independent recording studio, hosting sessions for artists from Chicago blues labels such as Vee-Jay, Mercury and Chess. Putnam and his studio's reputation grew quickly thanks to work with blues artists such as Muddy Waters, Willie Dixon, Bo Diddley, Little Walter, and Chuck Berry, and jazz artists like Count Basie, Stan Kenton, Sarah Vaughan, Dizzy Gillespie, Ella Fitzgerald, Little Walter, and Duke Ellington, who said Putnam was his favorite engineer. Putnam's period at Universal saw a number of 'firsts' for the recording industry, including the first use of tape repeat, the first vocal booth, the first multiple voice recording, one of the first to use 8-track recording (preceded by Les Paul and Tom Dowd), the first use of delay lines in the studio, and the first release, in 1956, of half-speed mastered discs (on the Mercury label.)

Universal Recording was the most advanced and largest independent recording facility in the country. Producers and arrangers such as Nelson Riddle, Mitch Miller and Quincy Jones grew to prefer the studio for their big band and orchestral recordings. Engineer Bruce Swedien began working for the studio. In 1957, Putnam sold his interest in Universal Recording and moved to Hollywood, where he established United Recording Corp. Upon Putnam's departure, Bernie Clapper became President of Universal Recording Corporation.

By 1967, Universal was operating five studios 24 hours a day, and began a $1 million 26,000 square foot expansion of four additional studios and more. Murray Alan became President of Universal Recording in the early 1970s. At its peak, Universal Recording Corporation employed over 400 people. In 1989, the Walton Street building was sold, and Universal Recording moved to 32 West Randolph Street. It closed for good shortly afterwards.
