= UREI =

American audio equipment manufacturer

- UREI logo
- Industry: Pro Audio
- Founded: 1967; United States
- Headquarters: United States

United Recording Electronics Industries (UREI) was a manufacturer of recording, mixing and audio signal processing hardware for the professional recording studio, live sound and broadcasting fields.

== History ==
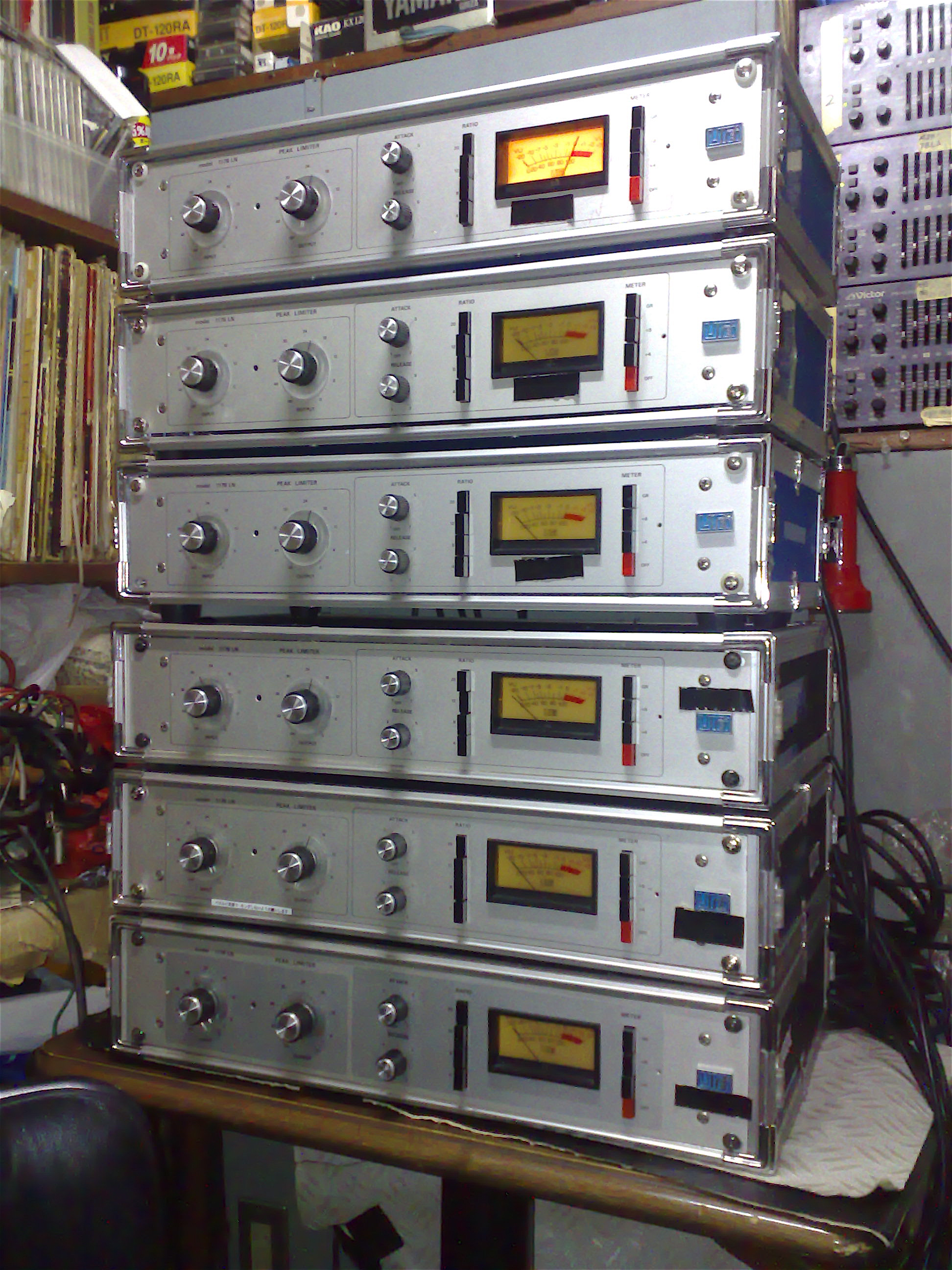
Six UREI 1176LN (revision H) compressors stacked in individual flight cases

Bill Putnam Sr. founded Universal Audio in Chicago in the 1950s as a design and manufacturing addition to his recording studio business, Universal Recording Corporation. After Putnam moved to Hollywood in 1957 and established the United Recording Corporation, his company acquired Studio Supply Co. and rebranded it as the Studio Electronics Corporation (SEC) and moved all manufacturing to the second floor of Western Recorders. By December, 1965, Universal Audio had been completely absorbed by Studio Electronics, although Studio Electronics continued to produce some Universal Audio-branded products.

In 1967, Studio Electronics acquired the broadcast division of Babcock Electronics, including Teletronix and the patent rights to the electro-optical LA-2A leveling amplifier. In anticipation of further acquisitions, SEC was rebranded as United Recording Electronics Industries, or UREI.

UREI subsequently acquired National Intertel; from this acquisition came technology which developed into the 1176 peak limiter in 1968, and the 1108 FET preamp. Other notable products included the UREI Teletronix LA-3A electro-optical leveling amplifier, LA-4 electro-optical compressor limiter, and UREI 500-series graphic equalizers. By 1976, UREI had moved their manufacturing and service center to Sun Valley, California.

UREI collaborated with Edward M. Long of E.M. Long Associates in Oakland, California, to create the 813 family of time-aligned large-format studio monitor speakers, introduced in 1977. The 813 and subsequent models introduced in 1979, including the 813A, 815A, and 811A, used Altec Lansing and Eminence drivers. In 1983, financial and quality control problems at Altec led UREI to introduce the 813B, which utilized JBL loudspeaker drivers.

JBL-UREI co-branding (1985 to 1987)

Putnam sold UREI to Harman in 1983, and UREI became a division of JBL Professional. Harman began releasing "JBL-UREI" co-branded products such as the 5547A graphic equalizer in 1986.

In 2005, another Harman division, Soundcraft, introduced a "UREI-by-Soundcraft"-badged 1620LE mixer, with 'LE' standing for 'Limited Edition'. The mixer was a re-issue of the UREI 1620, a 1980s-era clone of Rudy Bozak's classic 1960s-era rotary-style DJ mixer, the CMA-10-2DL. Soundcraft provided the new product line with its own website.
