= 1176 Peak Limiter =

Audio compressor

1176 Peak Limiter 1176 Limiting Amplifier
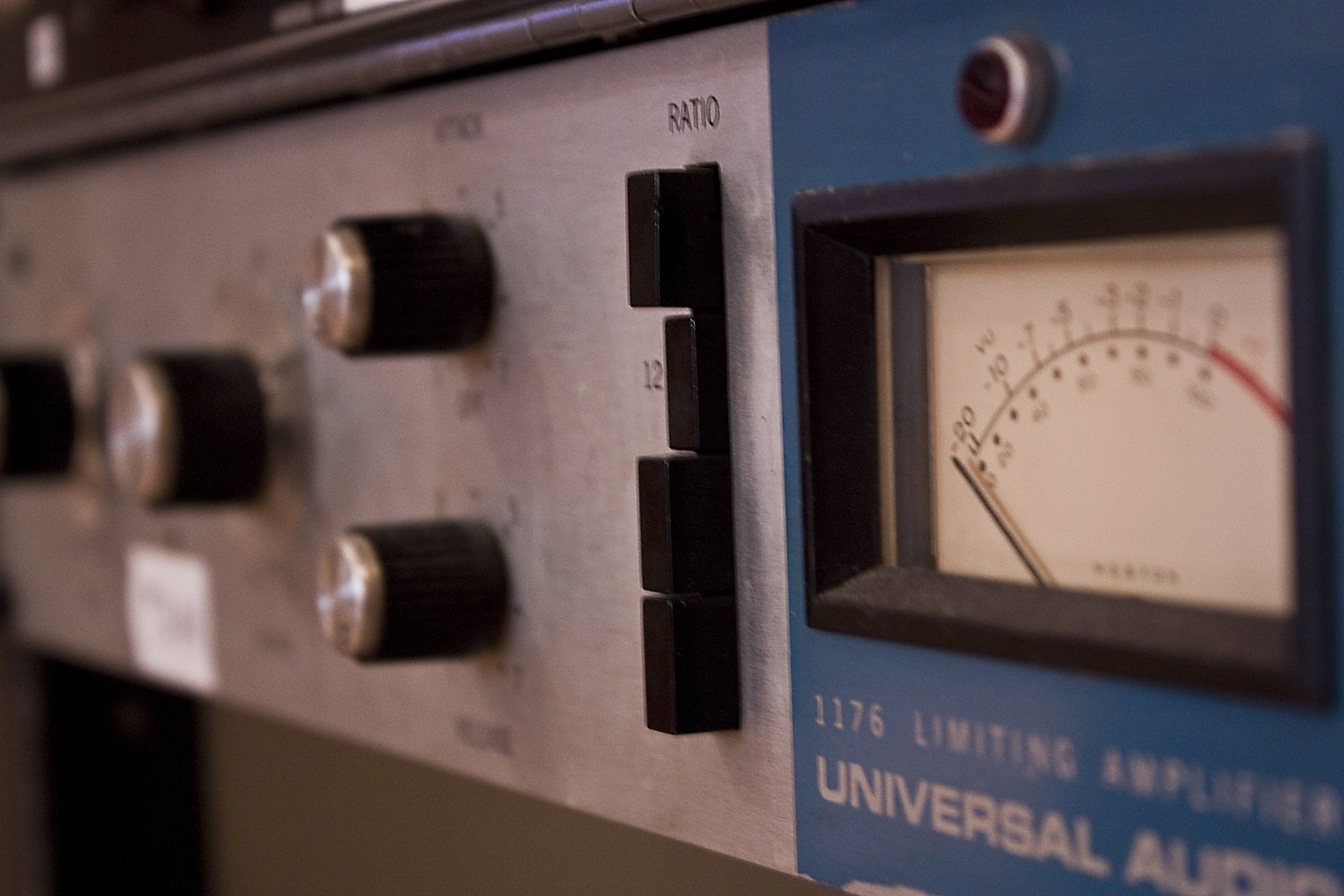
- UA 1176 Revision A
- Manufacturer: UREI, Universal Audio
- Dates: 1967–present

Technical specifications
- Effects type: Compressor/limiter
- Hardware: Analog

Controls

Input/output
- Inputs: 1
- Outputs: 1

The 1176 Peak Limiter is an audio compressor introduced by UREI in 1967. Derived from the company's earlier 175 and 176 vacuum tube-based compressors, it marked the transition from tube to solid-state technology.

The limiter featured Class A amplifiers, input and output transformers, fast attack and release times, and different compression ratios and modes. The 2019 book Innovation in Music states that the 1176 was immediately appreciated by engineers and producers and established as a studio standard through the years. At the time of its introduction, it was an early studio peak limiter to use all-solid-state circuitry, built around a then-newly invented field-effect transistor (FET) as its gain-reduction element.

The 1176LN was inducted into the TECnology Hall of Fame in 2008.

== History ==
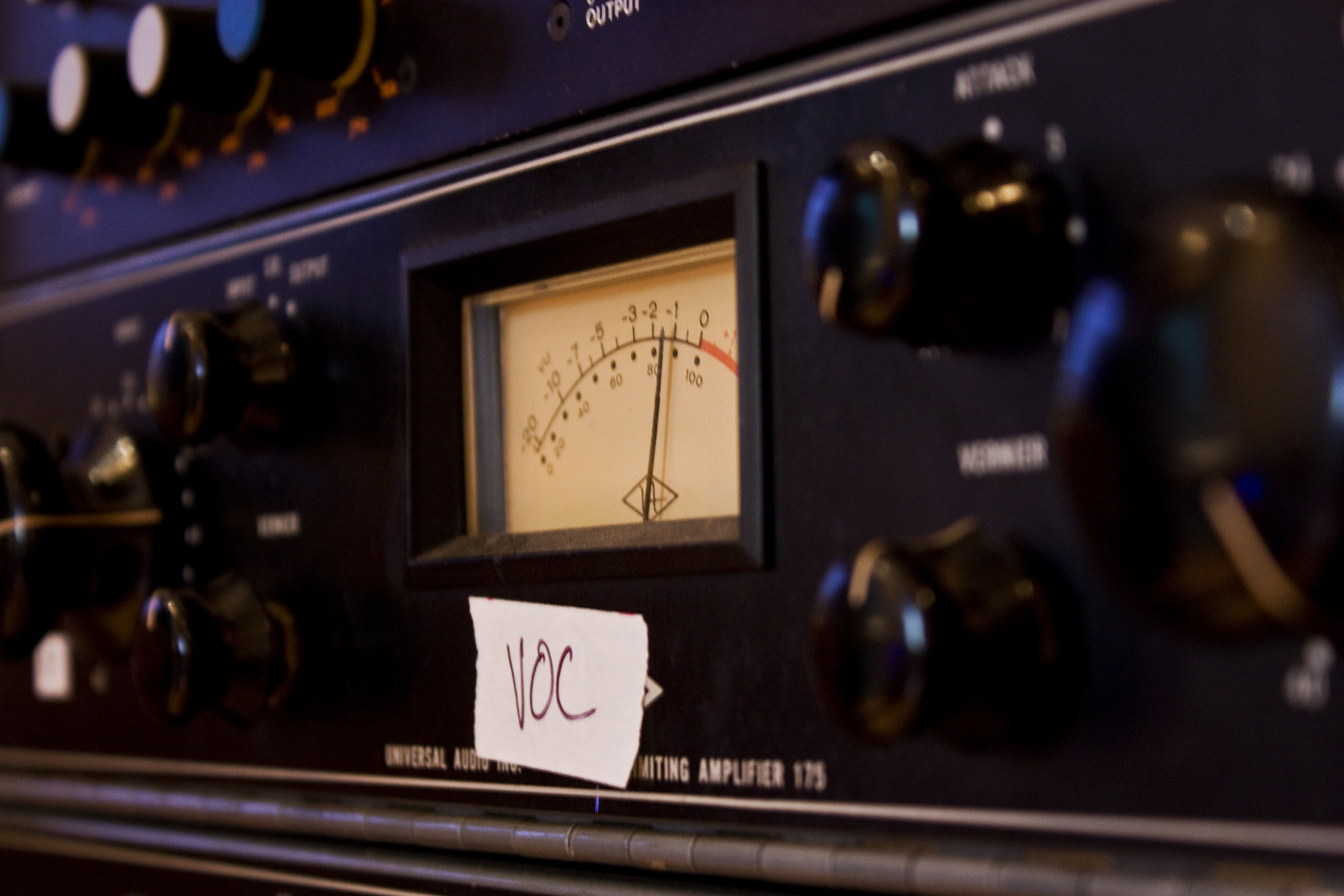
The UA 175 Limiting Amplifier, a predecessor of the 1176

In 1966, the engineer Bill Putnam, founder of UREI, began to replace vacuum tubes with field-effect transistors in his audio equipment designs. After successfully adapting the 108 tube microphone preamplifier into the new FET-based 1108, he redesigned the 175 and 176 variable-mu tube compressors into the 1176.

The initial units (A and AB revisions) were first made available in 1967 and were informally referred as the "blue stripe" units for their blue-colored meter section on a silver panel. Revision C, designed in 1970, saw one of the major design evolutions, with less noise and distortion. It was renamed to 1176LN, and the panel color was changed to solid black.

Bill Putnam sold UREI in 1985, and Revision H was the last series produced by the original company. However, the company was re-established as Universal Audio in 1999 by his sons Bill Putnam Jr. and Jim Putnam, and the company reissued the 1176LN as its first product. The original design was reproduced and revised from the extensive design notes left by Bill Putnam.

== Design ==
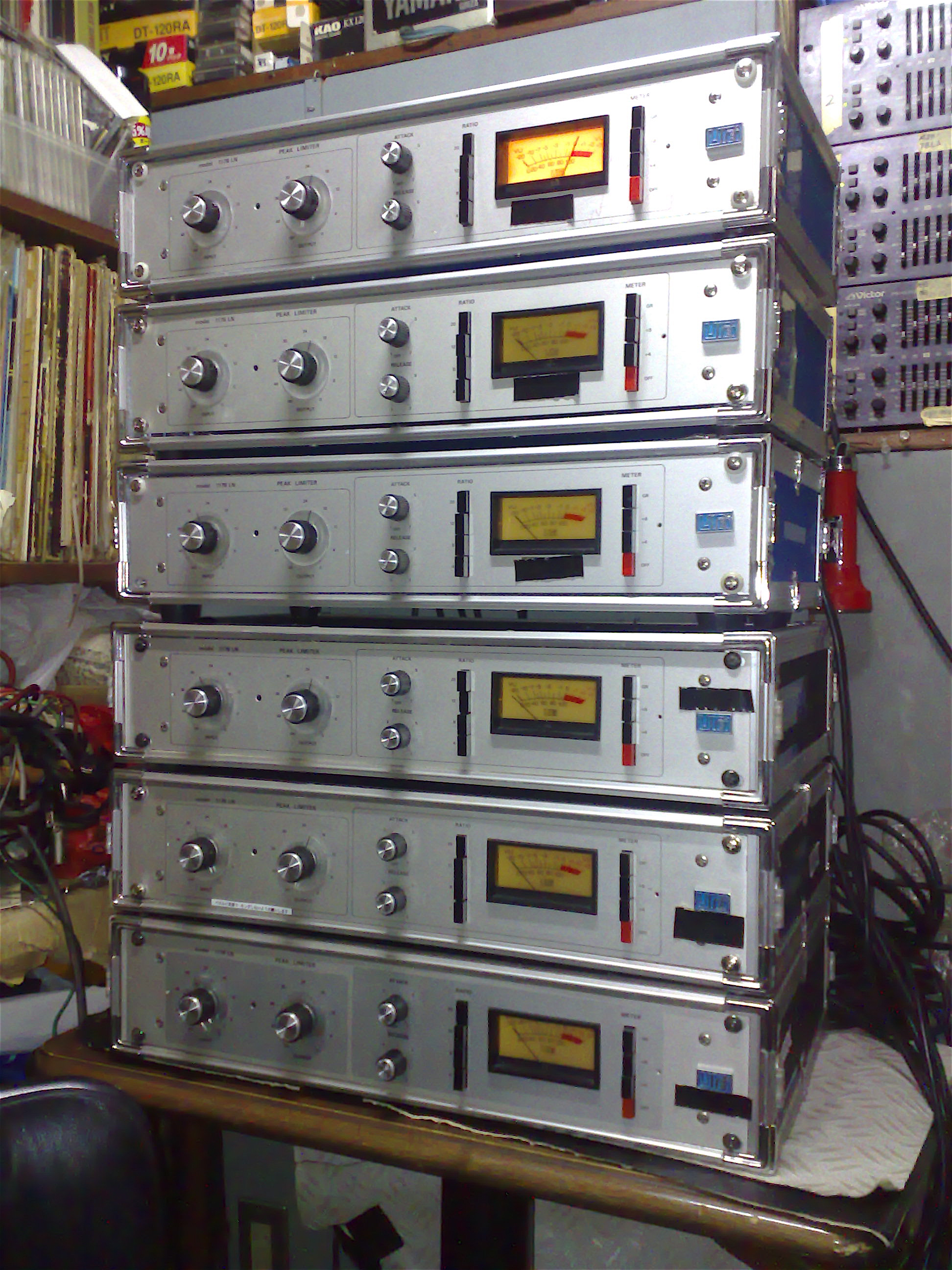
Six UREI 1176LN (revision H) compressors stacked in individual flight cases

The 1176 uses a field-effect transistor (FET) arranged in a feedback configuration to obtain gain reduction. As with its predecessors, the 1176 utilizes soft knee compression and a fixed threshold: compression amount is controlled through the input control. The release time is program-dependent: it is quicker after transients to obtain a more consistent level, but it slows down after sustained and heavy compression to reduce pumping artifacts. The threshold is set higher on higher ratios.

- Four different compression ratios are available: 4:1, 8:1, 12:1, and 20:1
- Attack time is adjustable from 20 μs to 800 μs (0.00002–0.0008 seconds)
- Release times are adjustable from 50 ms to 1100 ms (0.05–1.1 seconds)
- Two units can be linked for stereo operation

=== "All-button" or "British mode" ===
The unit's ratio selection buttons are designed to be mutually exclusive, so that pressing one would deselect the others. However, British engineers discovered it was possible to push all four buttons in at once, and that this led to a substantial increase of harmonic distortion. This became known as "All-button mode" or "British mode", and became popular enough to be explicitly supported by modern variants of the 1176.

The way the 1176 sounds, and specifically, the way all-button mode sounds, is partially due to its being a program dependent compressor. The attack and release are program dependent, as is the ratio.

The 1176 will faithfully compress or limit at the selected ratio for transients, but the ratio will always increase a bit after the transient. To what degree is once again material dependent. This is true for any of the 1176's ratio settings, and is part of the 1176's sound.

But in all-button mode, a few more things are happening; the ratio goes to somewhere between 12:1 and 20:1, and the bias points change all over the circuit. As a result, the attack and release times change. This change in attack and release times and the compression curve that results is the main contributor to the all-button sound. This is what gives way to the trademark overdriven tone. The shape of the compression curve changes dramatically in all-button. Where 4:1 is a gentle slope, all-button is more like severe plateau! Furthermore, in all-button mode there is a lag time on the attack of initial transients. This strange phenomenon might be described as a "reverse look-ahead".

— Will Shanks

== Revisions ==
The 1176 underwent a number of revisions; one notable change in the early revisions was the addition of Brad Plunkett's circuitry, which reduced noise by 6 dB and redistributed the noise spectrum, resulting in more noise reduction in the midrange; linearity was also increased by reducing distortion. These revisions, easily distinguishable for their solid black panel, were labelled 1176LN.

Revisions D and E are reputed to sound the best.

Revision	Design date	Serial numbers	Notes
Revision A	June 20, 1967	101–125	The original design by Bill Putnam; it had a brushed aluminium faceplate with a blue meter section. The output transformer was the UA-5002.
Revision AB	November 20, 1967	126–216	Several resistor values changes in signal pre-amp stages improved stability and noise.
Revision B	Not indicated	217–1078	FETs in the signal pre-amp were replaced with bipolar transistors (2N3391A).
Revision C	January 9, 1970	1079–1238	Low noise ("LN") circuitry was added in the signal preamp, reducing DS voltage on the gain reduction FET and keeping the FET within its linear range. The FET feedback circuit was revised to minimize distortion. Program dependency behavior was re-tuned. The faceplate was changed to anodized black.
Revision D	Not indicated	1239–2331	This revision had no circuit changes, but the additional low-noise circuitry was incorporated into a new main circuit board. "UREI" branding was added to the original "Universal Audio" branding.
Revision E	Not indicated	2332–2611	New power transformer, now switchable between 110 V and 220 V.
Revision F	March 15, 1973	2612–7052	The output amplifier was changed from a class A to a push-pull (class AB) design, based on the 1109 preamplifier, providing more output drive. The output transformer was changed to the B11148 type (already used in UREI LA-3A). Metering circuit now uses an op-amp.
Revision G	Not indicated	7053–7651	The input transformer was removed and replaced with a differential amplifier. Program dependency behavior was removed.
Revision H	Not indicated	7652–8000+	The faceplate was changed to the original silver faceplate and included a red "Off" button. The only version with a blue "UREI" logo and without "Universal Audio" branding.
Re-issue	4 January 2000	101–1959	Reproduction based on C, D and E revisions; most resembling the E model, due to the use of the switchable power transformer.
Re-issue	4 January 2000	1960–2946	Input attenuator and transformer changed, since the original Precision Electronics T-pad attenuator and 012 Magnetika transformer became unavailable.
Re-issue	4 January 2000	2947–	Production were resumed with T-pad attenuators and 012 Magnetika input transformers.
Revision AE	June 4, 2008	001–500	The "Anniversary Edition", limited to 500 units worldwide and resembling the first revisions with a black faceplate and a blue painted stripe, introduced a more moderate compression ratio of 2:1, a slow 10 ms attack and reintroduced revision A program dependency.

== Reputation ==
According to producer Mike Shipley, "The 1176 absolutely adds a bright character to a sound, and you can set the attack so it's got a nice bite to it...I like how variable the attack and release is; there's a sound on the attack and release which I don't think you can get with any other compressor." Engineer Jim Scott has stated that 1176 units "have an equalizer kind of effect, adding a coloration that's bright and clear."

== See also ==
- Empirical Labs Distressor
- LA-2A Leveling Amplifier
