= Parallel compression =

Dynamic range compression technique

Parallel compression, also known as New York compression, is a dynamic range compression technique used in sound recording and mixing. Parallel compression, a form of upward compression, is achieved by mixing an unprocessed 'dry', or lightly compressed signal with a heavily compressed version of the same signal. Rather than lowering the highest peaks for the purpose of dynamic range reduction, it decreases the dynamic range by raising up the softest sounds, adding audible detail. It is most often used on stereo percussion buses in recording and mixdown, on electric bass, and on vocals in recording mixes and live concert mixes.

== History ==
The internal circuitry of Dolby A noise reduction, introduced in 1965, contained parallel buses with compression on one of them, the two mixed in a flexible ratio. In October 1977, an article by Mike Beville was published in Studio Sound magazine describing the technique as applied to classical recordings. Many citations of this article claim that Beville called it "side-chain" compression, most likely due to a misquoting of a citation of the article in Roey Izhaki's book, Mixing Audio: Concepts, Practices and Tools. However, Beville used the term "side-chain" to describe the internal electronics and signal flow of compressors, not to describe a technique for using compressors. His discussion of parallel compression technique occurs in a separate section at the end of the article where he outlines how to place a limiter-compressor "in parallel with the direct signal" to obtain effective compression at low input levels. As Izhaki mentions in his book, others have referred to the technique as "side-chain" compression, which has made for confusion with the side-chain compression technique which uses an external "key" or "side chain" signal to determine compression on a target signal.

Beville's article, entitled "Compressors and Limiters," was reprinted in the same magazine in June 1988. A follow-up article by Richard Hulse in the April 1996 Studio Sound included application tips and a description of implementing the technique in a digital audio workstation. Bob Katz coined the term "parallel compression", and has described it as an implementation of "upward compression", the increase in audibility of softer passages. Studio engineers in New York City became known for reliance on the technique, and it picked up the name "New York compression".

== Use ==
The human ear is sensitive to loud sounds being suddenly reduced in volume, but less so to soft sounds being increased in volume—parallel compression takes advantage of this difference. Unlike normal limiting and downward compression, fast transients in music are retained in parallel compression, preserving the "feel" and immediacy of a live performance. Because the method is less audible to the human ear, the compressor can be set aggressively, with high ratios for strong effect.

In an audio mix using an analog mixing console and analog compressors, parallel compression is achieved by sending a monophonic or stereo signal in two or more directions and then summing the multiple pathways, mixing them together by ear to achieve the desired effect. One pathway is straight to the summing mixer, while other pathways go through mono or stereo compressors, set aggressively for high-ratio gain reduction. The compressed signals are brought back to the summing mixer and blended in with the straight signal.

If digital components are being used, latency must be taken into account. If the normal analog method is used for a digital compressor, the signals traveling through the parallel pathways will arrive at the summing mixer at slightly different times, creating unpleasant comb-filtering and phasing effects. The digital compressor pathway takes a little more time to process the sound—on the order of 0.3 to 3 milliseconds longer. Instead, the two pathways must both have the same number of processing stages: the "straight" pathway is assigned a compression stage which is not given an aggressively high ratio. In this case, the two signals both go through compression stages, and both pathways are delayed the same amount of time, but one is set to do no dynamic range compression, or to do very little, and the other is set for high amounts of gain reduction.

The method can be used artistically to "fatten" or "beef up" a mix, by careful setting of attack and release times on the compressor. These settings may be adjusted further until the compressor causes the signal to "pump" or "breathe" in tempo with the song, adding its own character to the sound. Unusually extreme implementations have been achieved by studio mix engineers such as New York-based Michael Brauer who uses five parallel compressors, adjusted individually for timbral and tonal variations, mixed and blended to taste, to achieve his target sound on vocals for the Rolling Stones, Aerosmith, Bob Dylan, KT Tunstall and Coldplay. Mix engineer Anthony "Rollmottle" Puglisi uses parallel compression applied conservatively across the entire mix, especially in dance-oriented electronic music: "it gives a track that extra oomph and power (not just make it louder—there's a difference) through quieter portions of the jam without resorting to one of those horrific 'maximizer' plugins that squeeze the dynamics right out of your song." While parallel compression is widely utilized in electronic dance music, "side-chain" compression is the technique popularly used to give a synth lead or other melodic element the pulsating quality ubiquitous in the genre. One or more tracks may be side-chained to the kick, thereby compressing them only when the beat occurs.
