= Pumping (audio) =

Artifact of compression in audio

In sound recording and reproduction, and music, pumping or gain pumping is a creative misuse of compression, the "audible unnatural level changes associated primarily with the release of a compressor." There is no correct way to produce pumping, and according to Alex Case, the effect may result from selecting "too slow or too fast...or too, um, medium" attack and release settings.

The technique is common in rock and electronic dance music. Examples include Phil Selway's (Radiohead) drum track on "Exit Music (For a Film)", electro percussion loop in Radiohead's "Idioteque", Benny Benassi's "Finger Food", and the ride cymbals on Portishead's "Pedestal".

Side-chain pumping is a more advanced technique using a compressor's side-chain feature which, "uses the amplitude envelope (dynamics profile) of one track as a trigger for a compressor used in another track." When the amplitude of a note of the side-chained instrument surpasses the threshold setting of the compressor it attenuates the compressed instrument, producing volume swells offset from the side-chained note by a selected release time. Found in house, techno, IDM, hip hop, dubstep, and drum 'n' bass, Eric Prydz's "Call On Me" is credited with popularizing the technique, though Daft Punk's "One More Time" contributed, while clear examples include Madonna's "Get Together" and Benny Benassi's "My Body (feat. Mia J)".
