= Valparaiso Technical Institute =

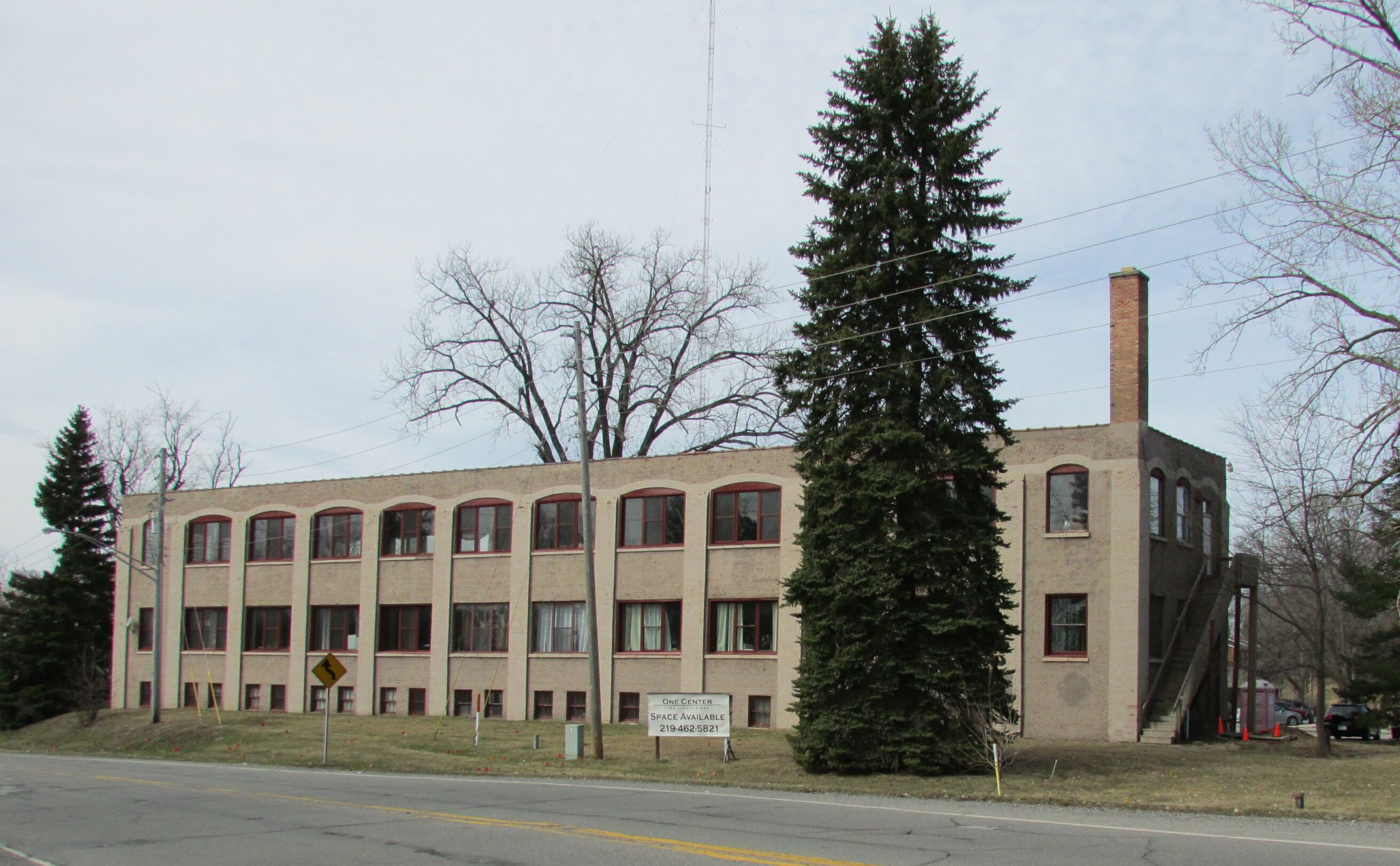
Dodge Hall, Valparaiso Technical Institute, Valparaiso, Indiana

Valparaiso Technical Institute was an educational institution located in Valparaiso, Indiana that was founded in 1874 and closed in 1991. It was originally established by G.A. Dodge as a department of Northern Indiana Normal School. After its reorganization in 1891 the school became the largest telegraph and railway instruction institution in the United States, and was known as "The Dodge Institute of Telegraphy."

The name was changed to Valparaiso Technical Institute in 1944 by J.B. Hershman, who is credited as the institute's first founder and president. Valparaiso Technical Institute specialized in Radio Engineering, television, Broadcasting, Police and Aviation Radio, Ultra High Frequency, and other Electronic training. Following the retirement or leave of all faculty, Valparaiso Technical Institute officially went defunct in April 1991. Nonetheless, the city's flag still contains a logo representing the former Valparaiso Technical Institute.

== History ==
Timeline
Date	Event
1868	George Dodge (Pittsburgh, Fort Wayne and Chicago Railway) opened the School of Telegraphy (Valparaiso Male and Female College –V.M.F.C.).
1871	Closing of VMFC and the School of Telegraphy.
1873	George Dodge opened the Telegraphy Department (Northern Indiana Normal College –N.I.N.C.).
1882	George Dodge sold interest in the Telegraphy Department to George L. Durand.
ca 1883	Durand sold his interest in the Dept. to Mr. Clarkson (Grand Trunk Railroad).
ca 1884	Mr. West (Pennsylvania Railroad) took over the school.
1885	O.T. Nichols is the general manager of the program.
1887	Dodge School of Telegraphy moved to the new west Valparaiso campus.
1888	Dodge School of Telegraphy opens as separate school from N.I.N.C.
1891	George M. Dodge (son of G.A. Dodge) becomes manager.
1909	Radio training is added.
1939	Dr. J. B. Hershman buys-out Dodge interest in the school.
1944	renamed Valparaiso Technical Institute (VTI).
1990	VTI closes.

== School of Telegraphy (1868–1888) ==
In 1868, George Dodge opened the School of Telegraphy as a department of Valparaiso Male and Female College (VMFC), a Methodist associated institution, with 13 students. At that time, Dodge was employed as telegrapher of the Pittsburgh, Fort Wayne and Chicago Railway and saw opportunity in better educating future telegraphers. With the closing of VMFC in 1871, the School of Telegraphy appears to have closed with it. When Henry B. Brown opened the Northern Indiana Normal School (N.I.N.S.) in 1873, George Dodge began negotiations to open a Telegraphy program. In 1874 George A. Dodge opened the School of Telegraphy as a department of N.I.N.S., but run on a percentage basis. Dodge collected tuition and paid all expenses of the school, but provided a fixed percentage to N.I.N.S. to provide for advertising through the Normal Schools connections.

In 1882, Dodge sold his interest to George L. Durand, who became the primary instructor. Within a few years, Durand sold his interest to a Mr. Clarkson the operator at the Grand Trunk Railroad station. The percentage fee system continued through all of these managers. When Mr. Clarkson discontinued the program, Mr. West the operator at the Pennsylvania station took over the school. In 1885, O.T. Nichols is shown as the general manager of the Telegraphic Department of the Normal School. The school was finally discontinued due to poor success in obtaining students.

== Dodge's Telegraph, Railway Accounting and Radio (Wireless) Institute (1888–1944) ==
Known as the Dodge Institute of Telegraphy

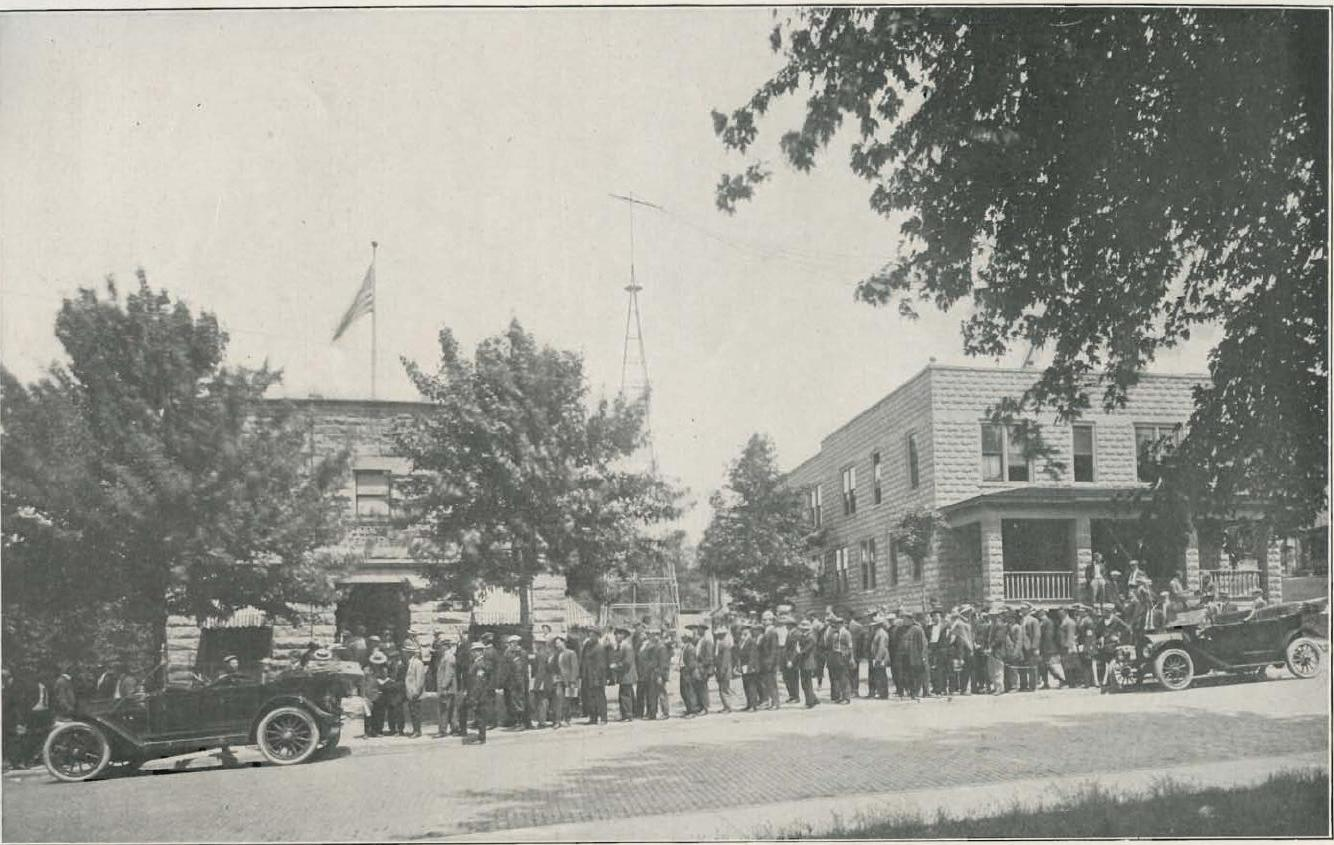
Dodge Institute, Valparaiso, Indiana 1926. School of Telegraphy and Radio.

In 1888, Dodge restructured the school as the Dodge School of Telegraphy, retaining the link to the Normal School. In 1891, Dodge and F. R. Lunbeck reorganized the school. It began to gain students and became the largest telegraph and railway instruction institution in the United States and later became known as "The Dodge Institute of Telegraphy". George A. Dodge managed the school until 1891, when his son, George M. Dodge assumed active control. Like his father, George M had served as a telegraph operator for the Pennsylvania railroad. In 1888, George A. became the Valparaiso manager for the Western Union Telegraph Company, serving for more than forty years The Dodge school has always taught Morse telegraphy and has enjoyed the distinction of being the foremost Morse telegraph training school. In December 1909, wireless instruction was added (the term "radio" was not in use), the growth of the radio (wireless) department since then has been almost miraculous.

== Valparaiso Technical Institute (1944–1991) ==
Dr. J. B. Hershman purchased the "Dodge Institute" in 1939. He changed the name to "Valparaiso Technical Institute" in 1944. Valparaiso Technical Institute (VTI) specialized in Radio Engineering, television, Broadcasting, Police and Aviation Radio, Ultra High Frequency, and all related Electronic training. Classes at Valpo Tech after World War II were almost totally veterans going to school under the GI Bill. In 1953 Valpo Tech had about 85% GIs. Classes for the Fall of 1990 were cancelled because the faculty had all retired or quit. Students in the lower semesters just lost what investment they had made. Students in the Sixth Semester stood to lose diplomas and degrees. A meeting was held with these students and several faculties, where an agreement was made that Valpo Tech would rent classroom space, some of the retired faculty would come back and teach, all so that they got legitimate diplomas or degrees. Valparaiso Technical Institute closed in April 1991.

== Facilities ==
The Dodge's Institute of Telegraphy was housed in the Institutes building at 89 East Monroe. The building still stands as an apartment complex at 405 East Monroe after the city numbering was changed early in the 20th Century.

The Valparaiso Technical Institute moved from the East Monroe location to the west side of town near the city limits, into the campus of "Herald Press," established in 1887. The building at 1150 W Lincolnway has been many things since it was built around 1908: A cut glass factory, a desk manufacturer, a technical school and a business incubator. VTI Campus:

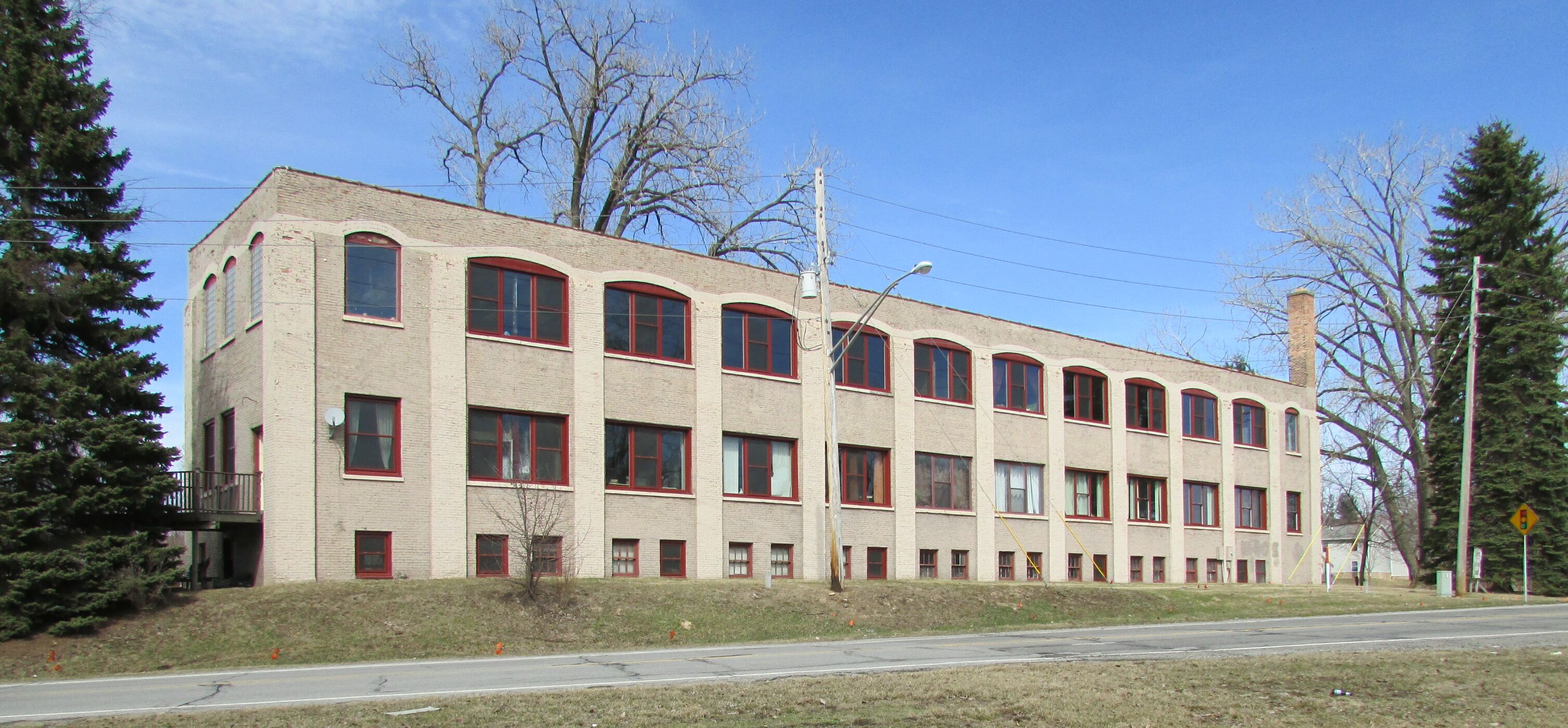
Dodge Hall (Classrooms)

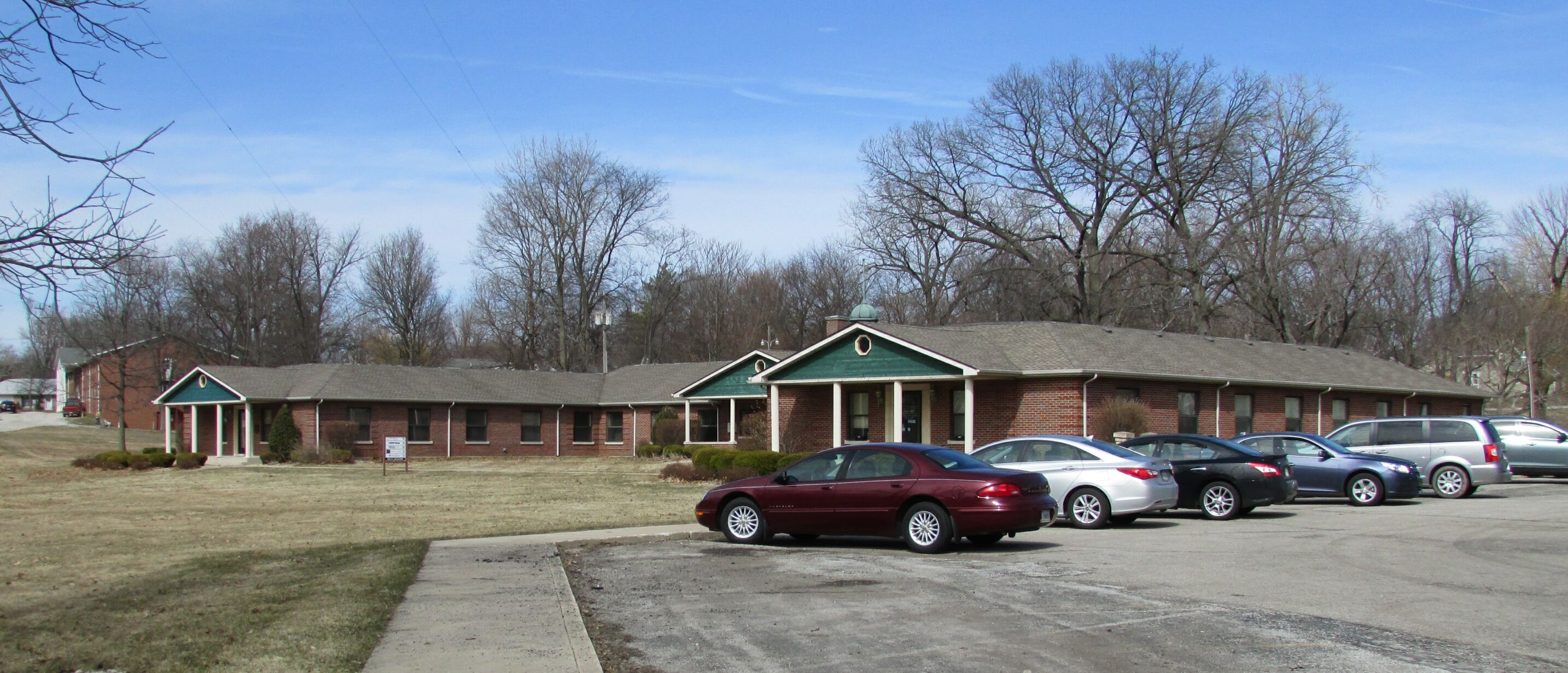
Memorial Hall (Dormitory)
