= Dynamic range compression =

Audio signal processing operation

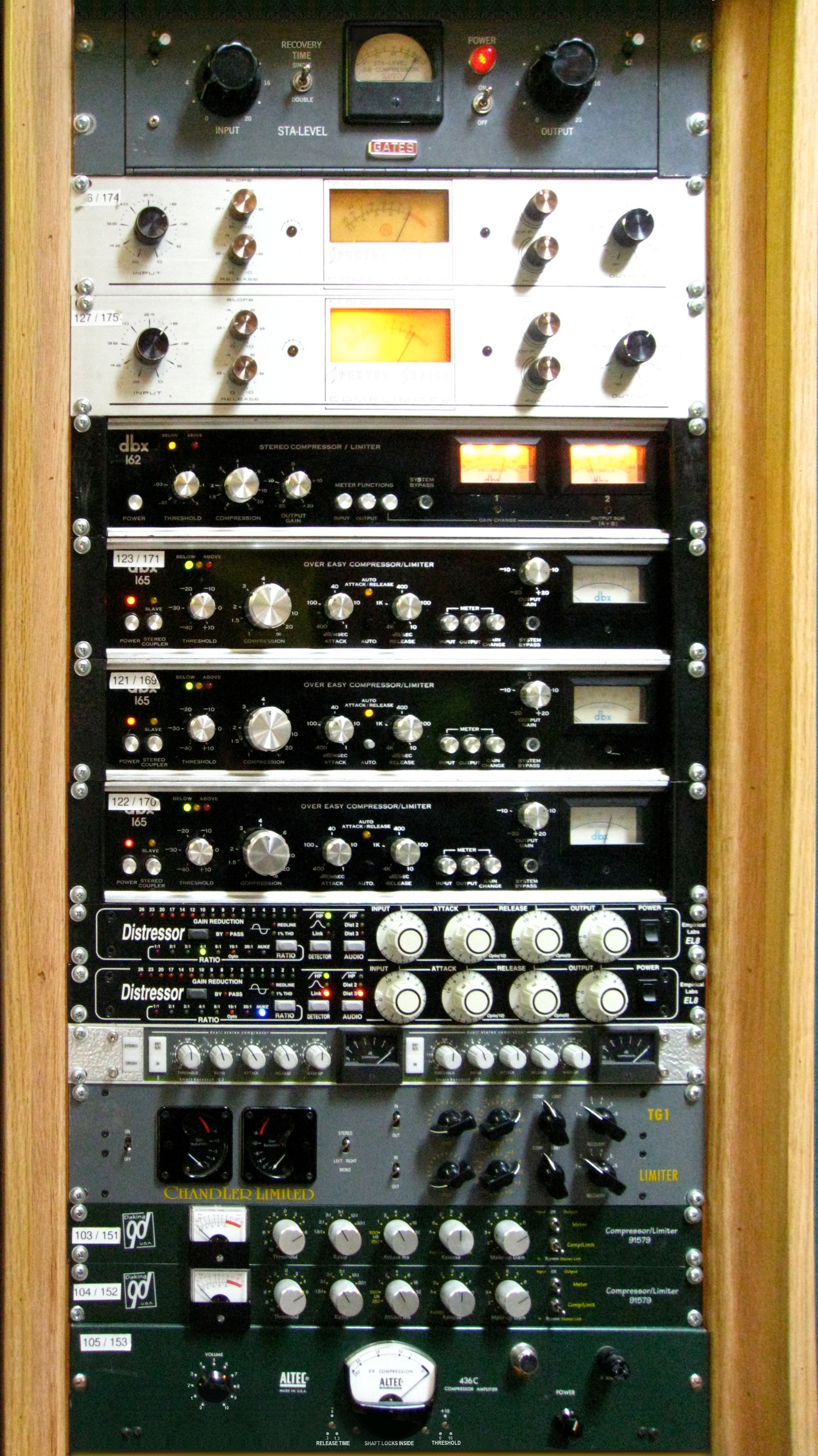
A rack of audio compressors in a recording studio. From top to bottom: Retro Instruments/Gates STA level; Spectra Sonic 610; Dbx 162; Dbx 165; Empirical Labs Distressor; Smart Research C2; Chandler Limited TG1; Daking FET (91579); and Altec 436c.

Dynamic range compression (DRC) or simply compression, is an audio signal processing operation that reduces the volume of loud sounds or amplifies quiet sounds, thus reducing or compressing an audio signal's dynamic range. Compression is commonly used in sound recording and reproduction, broadcasting, live sound reinforcement and some instrument amplifiers.

A dedicated electronic hardware unit or audio software that applies compression is called a compressor. In the 2000s, compressors became available as software plugins that run in digital audio workstation software. In recorded and live music, compression parameters may be adjusted to change the way they affect sounds. Compression and limiting are identical in process but different in degree and perceived effect. A limiter is a compressor with a high ratio and, generally, a short attack time.

Compression is used to improve performance and clarity in public address systems, as an effect and to improve consistency in mixing and mastering. It is used on voice to reduce sibilance and in broadcasting and advertising specifically to make an audio program stand out. It is an integral technology in some noise reduction systems.

== Types ==
Two methods of dynamic range compression

Downward compression

Upward compression

There are two types of compression: downward and upward. Both types of compression reduce the dynamic range of an audio signal.

Downward compression reduces the volume of loud sounds above a certain threshold. The quiet sounds below the threshold remain unaffected. This is the most common type of compressor. A limiter can be thought of as an extreme form of downward compression as it compresses the sounds over the threshold especially hard.

Upward compression increases the volume of quiet sounds below a certain threshold. The louder sounds above the threshold remain unaffected.

Some compressors also have the ability to do the opposite of compression, namely expansion. Expansion increases the dynamic range of the audio signal. Like compression, expansion comes in two types, downward and upward.

Downward expansion makes the quiet sounds below the threshold even quieter. A noise gate can be thought of as an extreme form of downward expansion as the noise gate make the quiet sounds (for instance: noise) quieter or even silent, depending on the floor setting.

Upward expansion makes the louder sounds above the threshold even louder.

== Design ==
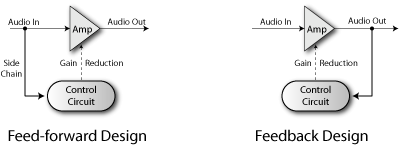
A feed-forward compressor design (left) and feedback design (right)

The signal entering a compressor is split; one copy is sent to a variable-gain amplifier and the other to a side-chain where the signal level is measured and a circuit controlled by the measured signal level applies the required gain to the amplifier. This design, known as a feed-forward type, is used today in most compressors. Earlier designs were based on a feedback layout where the signal level was measured after the amplifier.

There are a number of technologies used for variable-gain amplification, each having different advantages and disadvantages. Vacuum tubes are used in a configuration called variable-mu where the grid-to-cathode voltage changes to alter the gain. Optical compressors use a photoresistor stimulated by a small lamp (incandescent, LED, or electroluminescent panel) to create changes in signal gain. Other technologies used include field effect transistors and a diode bridge.

When working with digital audio, digital signal processing (DSP) techniques are commonly used to implement compression as audio plug-ins, in mixing consoles, and in digital audio workstations. Often the algorithms are used to emulate the above analog technologies.

== Controls and features ==
Different compression ratios for a signal level above the threshold

A number of user-adjustable control parameters and features are used to adjust dynamic range compression signal processing algorithms and components.

=== Threshold ===
A compressor reduces the level of an audio signal if its amplitude exceeds a certain threshold. Threshold is commonly set in decibels (dBFS for digital compressors and dBu for hardware compressors), where a lower threshold (e.g. −60 dB) means a larger portion of the signal is treated. When the signal level is below the threshold, no processing is performed and the input signal is passed, unmodified, to the output. Thus a higher threshold of, e.g., −5 dB, results in less processing, less compression.

Threshold timing behavior is subject to attack and release settings (see below). When the signal level goes above threshold, compressor operation is delayed by the attack setting. For an amount of time determined by the release after the input signal has fallen below the threshold, the compressor continues to apply dynamic range compression.

=== Ratio ===
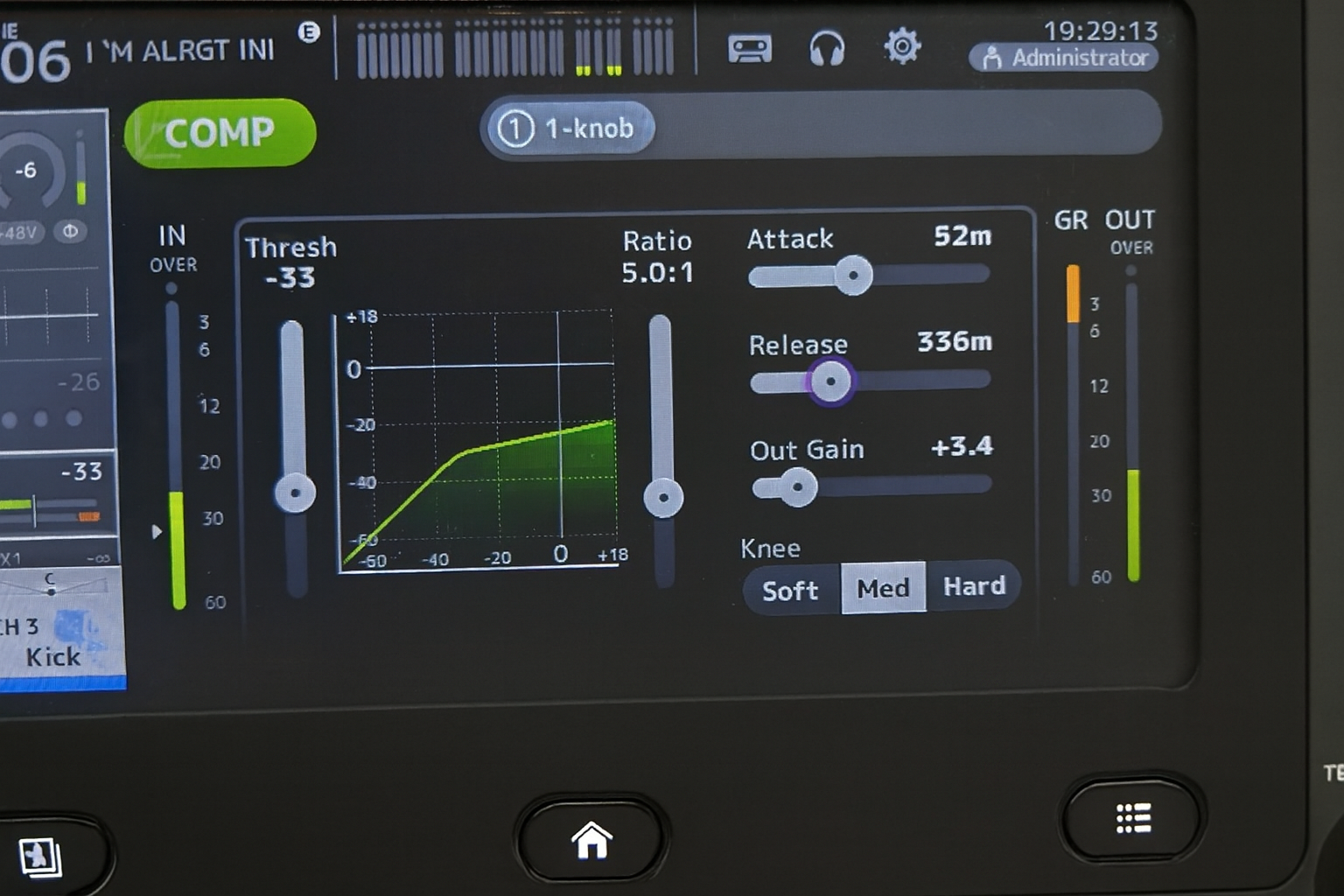
Compression by a ratio of 5.0:1 on a Yamaha digital mixer

The amount of gain reduction is determined by ratio: a ratio of 4:1 means that if input level is 4 dB over the threshold, the output signal level is reduced to 1 dB over the threshold. The gain and output level has been reduced by 3 dB. Another way of stating this is that any input signal level over the threshold will, in this case, be output at a level which is only 25% (i.e. 1 over 4) as much over the threshold as its input level was.

The highest ratio of $\infty$:1 is often known as limiting, and effectively denotes that any signal above the threshold is brought down to the threshold level once the attack time has expired.

=== Attack and release ===
The attack and release phases in a compressor

A compressor may provide a degree of control over how quickly it acts. The attack is the period when the compressor is decreasing gain in response to the increased level at the input to reach the gain determined by the ratio. The release is the period when the compressor is increasing gain in response to reduced level at the input to reach the output gain determined by the ratio, or, to unity, once the input level has fallen below the threshold. Because the loudness pattern of the source material is modified by the time-varying operation of compressor, it may change the character of the signal in subtle to quite noticeable ways depending on the attack and release settings used.

The length of each period is determined by the rate of change and the required change in gain. For more intuitive operation, a compressor's attack and release controls are labeled as a unit of time (often milliseconds). This is the amount of time it takes for the gain to change a set amount of dB or a set percentage towards the target gain. There is no industry standard for the exact meaning of these time parameters.

In many compressors, the attack and release times are adjustable by the user. Some compressors, however, have the attack and release times determined by the circuit design and cannot be adjusted. Sometimes the attack and release times are automatic or program dependent, meaning that the behavior may change depending on the input signal.

=== Knee ===
Hard Knee and Soft Knee compression

Another control a compressor might offer is knee selection. This controls whether the bend in the response curve between below threshold and above threshold is abrupt (hard) or gradual (soft). A soft knee slowly increases the compression ratio as the level increases and eventually reaches the compression ratio set by the user. A soft knee reduces the potentially audible transition from uncompressed to compressed, and is especially applicable for higher ratio settings where the changeover at the threshold would be more noticeable.

=== Peak vs RMS sensing ===
A peak-sensing compressor responds to the peak level of the input signal. While providing tighter peak level control, peak level sensing does not necessarily relate to human perception of loudness. Some compressors apply a power measurement function (commonly root mean square or RMS) on the input signal before comparing its level to the threshold. This produces a more relaxed compression that more closely relates to human perception of loudness.

=== Stereo linking ===
A compressor in stereo linking mode applies the same amount of gain reduction to both the left and right channels. This is done to prevent image shifting that can occur if each channel is compressed individually.

=== Make-up gain ===
Because a downward compressor only reduces the level of the signal, the ability to add a fixed amount of make-up gain at the output is usually provided so that an optimum output level is produced.

=== Look-ahead ===
The look-ahead function is designed to overcome the problem of being forced to compromise between slow attack rates that produce smooth-sounding gain changes, and fast attack rates capable of catching transients. Look-ahead is implemented by splitting the input signal and delaying one side (the audio signal) by the look-ahead time. The non-delayed side (the gain control signal) is used to drive the compression of the delayed signal, which then appears at the output. This way a smooth-sounding slower attack rate can be used to catch transients. The cost of this solution is added audio latency through the processor.

== Uses ==
=== Public spaces ===
Compression is often applied in audio systems for restaurants, retail, and similar public environments that play background music at a relatively low volume and need it compressed, not just to keep the volume fairly constant, but also to make quiet parts of the music audible over ambient noise.

Compression can increase average output gain of a power amplifier by 50 to 100% with a reduced dynamic range. For paging and evacuation systems, this may add clarity under noisy circumstances and can therefore impact the number of amplifiers required.

=== Music production ===
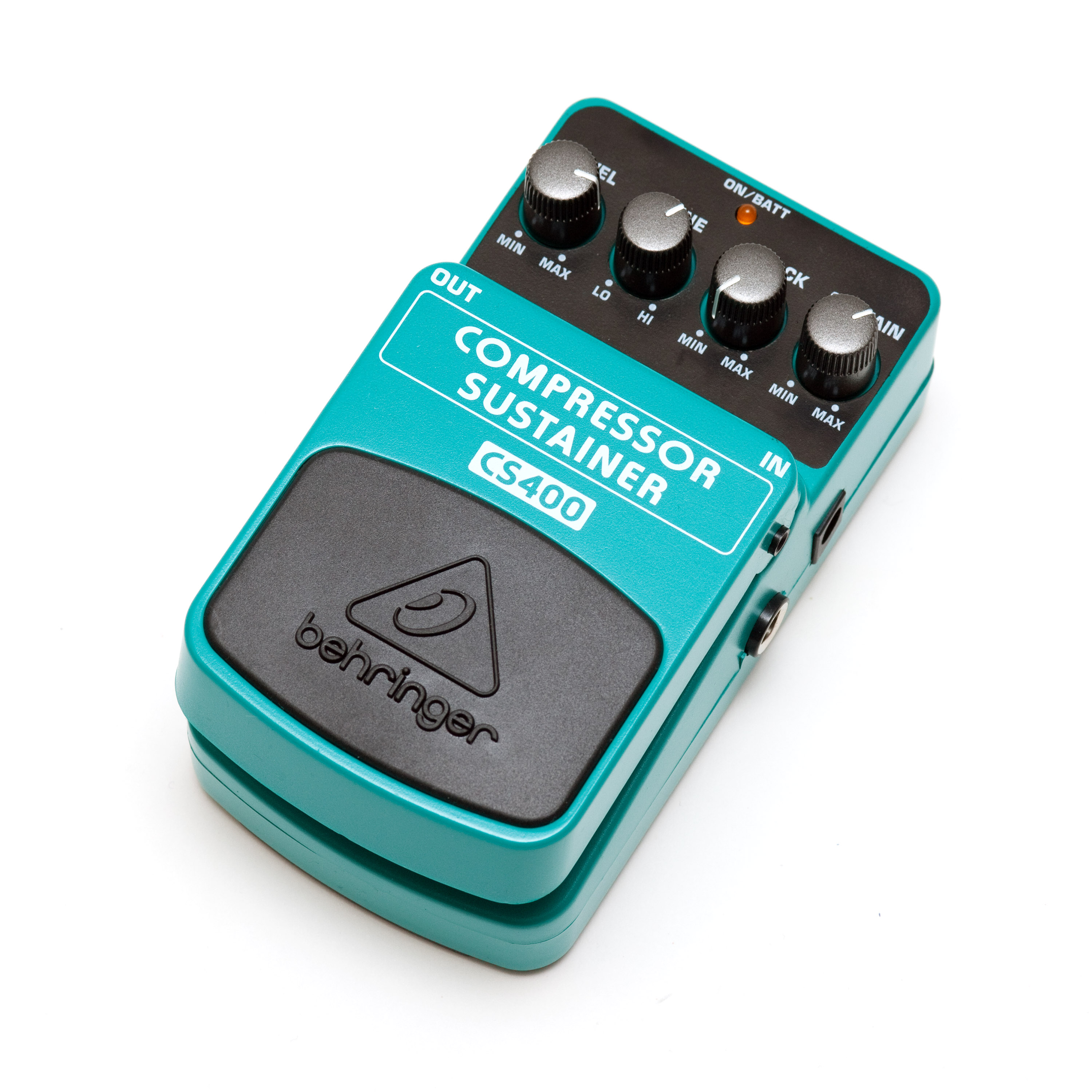
An inexpensive guitar compressor

Compression is often used in music production to make instruments more consistent in dynamic range, so that they "sit" more nicely in the mix with the other instruments (neither disappear during short periods of time, nor overpower the other instruments during short periods). Vocal performances in rock music or pop music are compressed for the same reason.

Compression can also be used on instrument sounds to create effects not primarily focused on stabilizing the volume. For instance, drum and cymbal sounds tend to decay quickly, but a compressor can make the sound appear to have a more sustained tail. Guitar sounds are often compressed to produce a fuller, more sustained sound. Adjusting the attack and release time of a compressor can be used to increase contrast between the transient and sustain parts of a sounds envelope.

Most devices capable of compressing audio dynamics can also be used to reduce the volume of one audio source when another audio source reaches a certain level; this is called side-chaining. In electronic dance music, side-chaining is often used on basslines, controlled by the kick drum or a similar percussive trigger, to prevent the two from conflicting, and provide a pulsating, rhythmic dynamic to the sound.

=== Voice ===
A compressor can be used to reduce sibilance ('ess' sounds) in vocals (de-essing) by feeding the compressor's side-chain an equalized version of the input signal, so that specific, sibilance-related frequencies (typically 4000 to 8000 hz) activate the compressor more.

Compression is used in voice communications in amateur radio that employ single-sideband (SSB) modulation to make a particular station's signal more readable to a distant station, or to make one's station's transmitted signal stand out against others. This is applicable especially in DXing. An SSB signal's strength depends on the level of modulation. A compressor increases the average level of the modulation signal thus increasing the transmitted signal strength. Most modern amateur radio SSB transceivers have speech compressors built-in. Compression is also used in land mobile radio, especially in transmitted audio of professional walkie-talkies and remote control dispatch consoles.

=== Broadcasting ===
Compression is used extensively in broadcasting to boost the perceived volume of sound while reducing the dynamic range of source audio. To avoid overmodulation, broadcasters in most countries have legal limits on instantaneous peak volume they may broadcast. Normally these limits are met by permanently inserted compression hardware in the on-air chain.

Broadcasters use compressors in order that their station sounds louder than comparable stations. The effect is to make the more heavily compressed station jump out at the listener at a given volume setting. This is not limited to inter-channel differences; they also exist between programme material within the same channel. Loudness differences are a frequent source of audience complaints, especially TV commercials and promos that seem too loud.

The European Broadcasting Union (EBU) has been addressing this issue in the EBU PLOUD group, which consists of over 240 audio professionals, many from broadcasters and equipment manufacturers. In 2010, the EBU published EBU R 128 which introduces a new way of metering and normalizing audio. The Recommendation uses ITU-R BS.1770 loudness metering. As of 2016, several European TV stations have announced their support for the new norm and over 20 manufacturers have announced products supporting the new EBU Mode loudness meters.

To help audio engineers understand what loudness range their material consists of (e.g. to check if some compression may be needed to fit it into the channel of a specific delivery platform), the EBU also introduced the Loudness Range (LRA) descriptor.

=== Marketing ===
Most television commercials are heavily compressed to achieve near-maximum perceived loudness while staying within permissible limits. This causes a problem that TV viewers often notice: when a station switches from minimally compressed program material to a heavily compressed commercial, the volume sometimes seems to increase dramatically. Peak loudness might be the same—meeting the letter of the law—but high compression puts much more of the audio in the commercial at close to the maximum allowable, making the commercial seem much louder.

=== Over-usage ===
The trend of increasing loudness as shown by waveform images of the song "Something" by The Beatles mastered on CD four times since 1983

Record companies, mixing engineers and mastering engineers have been gradually increasing the overall loudness of commercial albums. This is achieved by using higher degrees of compression and limiting during mixing and mastering; compression algorithms have been engineered specifically to accomplish the task of maximizing audio level in the digital stream. Hard limiting or clipping can result, affecting the tone and timbre of the music. The effort to increase loudness has been referred to as the loudness war.

=== Other uses ===
Noise reduction systems use a compressor to reduce the dynamic range of a signal for transmission or recording, expanding it afterward, a process called companding. This reduces the effects of a channel or recording medium with limited dynamic range.

Instrument amplifiers often include compression circuitry to prevent sudden high-wattage peaks that could damage the speakers. Electric bass players often use compression effects, either effects units available in pedal, rackmount units, or built-in devices in bass amps, to even out the sound levels of their basslines.

Gain pumping, where a regular amplitude peak (such as a kick drum) causes the rest of the mix to change in volume due to the compressor, is generally avoided in music production. However, many dance and hip-hop musicians purposefully use this phenomenon, causing the mix to alter in volume rhythmically in time with the beat.

Hearing aids use a compressor to bring the audio volume into the listener's hearing range. To help the patient perceive the direction sound comes from, some hearing aids use binaural compression.

Compressors are also used for hearing protection in some electronic active hearing protection earmuffs and earplugs, to let sounds at ordinary volumes be heard normally while attenuating louder sounds, possibly also amplifying softer sounds. This allows, for example, shooters wearing hearing protection at a shooting range to converse normally, while sharply attenuating the much louder sounds of the gunshots, and similarly for musicians to hear quiet music but be protected from loud noises such as drums or cymbal crashes.

In applications of machine learning where an algorithm is training on audio samples, dynamic range compression is a way to augment samples for a larger data set.

== Limiting ==
Limiting and clipping compared. Note that clipping introduces a large amount of distortion whereas limiting only introduces a small amount while keeping the signal within the threshold.

Compression and limiting are identical in process but different in degree and perceived effect. A limiter is a compressor with a high ratio and, generally, a fast attack time. Compression with ratio of 10:1 or more is generally considered limiting.

Brick wall limiting has a very high ratio and a very fast attack time. Ideally, this ensures that an audio signal never exceeds the amplitude of the threshold. Ratios of 20:1 all the way up to ∞:1 are considered brick wall. The sonic results of more than momentary and infrequent brick-wall limiting are harsh and unpleasant, thus it is more common as a safety device in live sound and broadcast applications.

Some bass amps and PA system amplifiers include limiters to prevent sudden volume peaks from causing distortion or damaging the speakers.

== Side-chaining ==
The sidechain of a feed-forward compressor

Uplifting Trance Sidechain
The first 8 bars are without side-chaining applied, the second 8 are with side-chaining.

A compressor with a side-chain input controls gain from main input to output based on the level of the signal at the side-chain input. An early innovator of side-chain compression in an effects unit was the Eventide Omnipressor from 1974. With side-chaining, the compressor behaves in the conventional manner when both main and side-chain inputs are supplied with the same signal.

The side-chain input is used by disc jockeys for ducking – lowering the music volume automatically when speaking. The DJ's microphone signal is routed to the side-chain input so that whenever the DJ speaks the compressor reduces the volume of the music.

A sidechain with equalization controls can be used to reduce the volume of signals that have a strong spectral content within a certain frequency range: it can act as a de-esser, reducing the level of vocal sibilance in the range of 6–9 kHz. Another use of the side-chain in music production serves to maintain a loud bass track without the bass drum causing undue peaks that result in loss of overall headroom.

== Parallel compression ==
Inserting the compressor in a parallel signal path is known as parallel compression. It is a form of upward compression that facilitates dynamic control without significant audible side effects so long as the ratio is relatively low and the compressor's sound is relatively neutral. On the other hand, a high compression ratio with significant audible artifacts can be chosen in one of the two parallel signal paths. This is used by some concert mixers and recording engineers as an artistic effect called New York compression or Motown compression. Combining a linear signal with a compressor and then reducing the output gain of the compression chain results in low-level detail enhancement without any peak reduction; The compressor significantly adds to the combined gain at low levels only.

== Multiband compression ==
Multiband compressors can act differently on different frequency bands. The advantage of multiband compression over full-bandwidth compression is that problems related to a specific frequency range can be fixed without unnecessary compression in the other, unrelated frequencies. The downside is that frequency-specific compression is more complex and requires more processing capacity than full-bandwidth compression and can introduce phase issues.

Multiband compressors work by first splitting the signal through some number of band-pass filters, crossover filters or filter banks. Each split signal then passes through its own compressor and is independently adjustable for threshold, ratio, attack, and release. The signals are then recombined and an additional limiting circuit may be employed to ensure that the combined signals do not create unwanted peak levels.

In music production, multiband compressors are primarily an audio mastering tool, but their inclusion in digital audio workstation plug-in sets is increasing their use among mix engineers. The TC Electronic Finalizer included a three band compressor and was a popular audio mastering tool around year 2000.

On-air signal chains of radio stations commonly use multiband compressors to increase loudness while avoiding overmodulation. Having a louder sound is often considered an advantage in commercial broadcasting.

In recent years, aggressive multiband compression (known as OTT, after a preset for Ableton Live's stock multiband compressor) , has become associated with a certain sonic character often pursued loud electronic music genres like Dubstep.

== Serial compression ==
Serial compression is a technique used in sound recording and mixing. Serial compression is achieved by using two fairly different compressors in a signal chain. One compressor generally stabilizes the dynamic range while the other aggressively compresses stronger peaks. This is the normal internal signal routing in common combination devices marketed as compressor-limiters, where an RMS compressor (for general gain control) is followed by a fast peak-sensing limiter (for overload protection). Done properly, even heavy serial compression can sound natural in a way not possible with a single compressor. It is most often used to even out erratic vocals and guitars.

== Software audio players ==
Some software audio players support plugins that implement compression. These can increase loudness of audio tracks, or level out the volume of highly-variable music (such as classical music, or a playlist that spans multiple music types). This improves the listenability of audio played through poor-quality speakers, or when played in noisy environments (such as in a car or during a party).

== Objective influence on the signal ==
In an article published in January 2014 by the Journal of the Audio Engineering Society, Emmanuel Deruty and Damien Tardieu performed a systematic study describing the influence of compressors and brickwall limiters on the musical audio signal. The experiment involved four software limiters: Waves L2, Sonnox Oxford Limiter, Thomas Mundt's Loudmax, Blue Cat's Protector, as well as four software compressors: Waves H-Comp, Sonnox Oxford Dynamics, Sonalksis SV-3157, and URS 1970. The study provides objective data on what limiters and compressors do to the audio signal.

Five signal descriptors were considered: RMS power, EBU R 128 integrated loudness, crest factor, R 128 LRA, and density of clipped samples. RMS power accounts for the signal's physical level, R 128 loudness for the perceived level. The crest factor, which is the difference between the signal's peak and its average power, is on occasions considered as a basis for the measure of micro-dynamics, for instance in the TT Dynamic Range Meter plug-in. Finally, R 128 LRA has been repeatedly considered as a measure of macro-dynamics or dynamics in the musical sense.

=== Limiters ===
The tested limiters had the following influence on the signal:

- increase of RMS power,
- increase of EBU R 128 loudness,
- decrease of crest factor,
- decrease of EBU R 128 LRA, but only for high amounts of limiting,
- increase of clipped sample density.

In other words, limiters increase both physical and perceptual levels, increase the density of clipped samples, decrease the crest factor and decrease macro-dynamics (LRA) given that the amount of limiting is substantial.

=== Compressors ===
As far as the compressors are concerned, the authors performed two processing sessions, using a fast attack (0.5 ms) in one case, and a slow attack (50 ms) in the other. Make-up gain is deactivated, but the resulting file is normalized.

Set with a fast attack, the tested compressors had the following influence on the signal:

- slight increase of RMS power,
- slight increase of EBU R 128 loudness,
- decrease of crest factor,
- decrease of EBU R 128 LRA,
- slight decrease of clipped sample density.

In other words, fast-attack compressors increase both physical and perceptual levels, but only slightly. They decrease the density of clipped samples, and decrease both crest factor and macro-dynamics.

Set with a slow attack, the tested compressors had the following influence on the signal:

- decrease of RMS power,
- decrease of EBU R 128 loudness,
- no influence on crest factor,
- decrease of EBU R 128 LRA,
- no influence on clipped sample density.

In other words, slow-attack compressors decrease both physical and perceptual levels, decrease macro-dynamics, but have no influence on crest factor and clipped sample density.

== See also ==
- 1176 Peak Limiter
- Automatic gain control
- Gain compression, similar (but generally undesired) reductions in waveform gain, caused by amplifier circuit imperfections
- LA-2A Leveling Amplifier
- Squelch
- Tone mapping, the photographic equivalent
