= TEC Awards =

Annual award for the achievements of audio professionals

The TEC Awards is an annual program recognizing the achievements of audio professionals. The awards are given to honor technically innovative products as well as companies and individuals who have excelled in sound for television, film, recordings, and concerts. TEC is an acronym for Technical Excellence and Creativity.

== History ==
The awards were founded in 1985 by Mix magazine, with awards events held annually at Audio Engineering Society conventions. In 1990, the TEC Foundation for Excellence in Audio, a 501(c)(3) (non-profit) public benefit organization that also offered scholarships and worked to mitigate noise-induced hearing loss, assumed responsibility for the awards. In 2011, the TEC Awards program was held at the NAMM Show, and in 2013 the TEC Foundation was merged with the NAMM Foundation, the educational and charitable arm of NAMM.

== Awards process ==
The TEC Awards list of finalists are compiled annually by the TEC Awards Finalist Panel, a committee of industry professionals. The list of finalists is published on the TEC Award's website. The winners are announced and the awards presented at a ceremony held at the NAMM Show, one of the largest trade shows for the music products industry, held each January in Anaheim, California.

== Other honors ==
=== TEC Awards Hall of Fame ===
Similarly, a pioneering or innovative person is chosen annually for the honor of induction into the TEC Awards Hall of Fame. This special award was established in 1988 and the winner is selected by the TEC Awards nominating panel.

=== TEC Innovation Award ===
In addition, through the TEC Innovation Award (formerly known as the Les Paul Award), the TEC Awards nominating panel and the board of directors of the TEC Foundation honor "individuals or institutions that have set the highest standards of excellence in the creative application of audio technology." Gibson Musical Instruments, maker of the Gibson Les Paul electric guitar, was a sponsor of the Les Paul Award. This special award was established in 1991. In 1997, Les Paul presented his namesake award to Stevie Wonder and in 2003, jointly with Bob Ludwig, he announced that Bruce Springsteen, who was unable to attend the event, would receive that year's award. In 2007, at age 92, Les Paul presented the award to musician, songwriter, and producer Al Kooper. In 2025, Jack White received the TEC Innovation Award.

=== TECnology Hall of Fame ===
In 2004, the TEC Awards established the TECnology Hall of Fame "to honor and recognize audio products and innovations that have made a significant contribution to the advancement of audio technology." A product must be ten years old to receive the honor. At the establishment of this award category at the AES Convention in San Francisco in October 2004, the initial 25 inductees included the venerable Edison cylinder (1877), Emile Berliner's flat disc recorder (1887), and Alan Dower Blumlein Stereo Patent (1931).

== See also ==
- List of engineering awards
