= Signal-to-interference ratio =

Ratio of useful signal versus co-channel interference received

The signal-to-interference ratio (SIR or S/I), also known as the carrier-to-interference ratio (CIR or C/I), is the quotient between the average received modulated carrier power S or C and the average received co-channel interference power I, i.e. crosstalk, from other transmitters than the useful signal.

The CIR resembles the carrier-to-noise ratio (CNR or C/N), which is the signal-to-noise ratio (SNR or S/N) of a modulated signal before demodulation. A distinction is that interfering radio transmitters contributing to I may be controlled by radio resource management, while N involves noise power from other sources, typically additive white Gaussian noise (AWGN).

== Carrier-to-noise-and-interference ratio (CNIR) ==
The CIR ratio is studied in interference limited systems, i.e. where I dominates over N, typically in cellular radio systems and broadcasting systems where frequency channels are reused in view to achieve high level of area coverage. The C/N is studied in noise limited systems. If both situations can occur, the carrier-to-noise-and-interference ratio (CNIR or C/(N+I)) may be studied.

== See also ==
- Carrier-to-noise ratio (CNR or C/N)
- Carrier-to-receiver noise density (C/N_{0})
- Co-channel interference (CCI)
- Crosstalk
- Signal-to-noise ratio (SNR or S/N)
- SINAD (ratio of signal-plus-noise-plus-distortion to noise-plus-distortion)
