= Reference noise =

In telecommunications, reference noise is the magnitude of circuit noise chosen as a reference for measurement.

Many different levels with a number of different weightings are in current use, and care must be taken to ensure that the proper parameters are stated.

Specific ones include: dBa, dBa(F1A), dBa(HA1), dBa0, dBm, dBm(psoph), dBm0, dBrn, dBrnC, dBrnC0, dBrn(f_{1}-f_{2}), dBrn(144-line), dBx.
