= Transmission level point =

Test point for signal monitoring

In telecommunications, a transmission level point (TLP) is a test point in an electronic circuit that is typically a transmission channel. At the TLP, a test signal may be introduced or measured. Various parameters, such as the power of the signal, noise, voltage levels, wave forms, may be measured at the TLP.

The nominal transmission level at a TLP is a function of system design and is an expression of the design gain or attenuation (loss).

Voice-channel transmission levels at test points are measured in decibel-milliwatts (dBm) at a frequency of ~1000 hertz.

The dBm is an absolute reference level measurement (see Decibel § Suffixes and reference values) with respect to 1 mW power. When the nominal signal power is 0dBm at the TLP, the test point is called a zero transmission level point, or zero-dBm TLP. The abbreviation dBm0 stands for the power in dBm measured at a zero transmission level point. The TLP is thus characterized by the relation:

TLP = dBm − dBm0

The term TLP is commonly used as if it were a unit, preceded by the nominal level for the test point. For example, the expression 0TLP refers to a 0dBmTLP. If for instance a signal is specified as -13 dBm0 at a particular point and -6 dBm is measured at that point, the TLP is +7 TLP.

The level at a TLP where an end instrument, such as a telephone set, is connected is usually specified as 0dBm.

== See also ==
- Alignment level
- Nominal level
- Digital milliwatt
