= Line out =

Line out can refer to:

- Line out (signal), an analog electrical signal for connection between audio devices
- Line-out (rugby union), a means of restarting play in rugby union
- Lineout (baseball), a type of play in baseball when a player catches a line drive
