= Broadcast license =

License granting permission to use radio frequency spectrum for broadcasting use

A broadcast license is a type of spectrum license granting the licensee permission to use a portion of the radio frequency spectrum in a given geographical area for broadcasting purposes. The licenses generally include restrictions, which vary from band to band.

Spectrum may be divided according to use. As indicated in a graph from the National Telecommunications and Information Administration (NTIA), frequency allocations may be represented by different types of services which vary in size. Many options exist when applying for a broadcast license; the FCC determines how much spectrum to allot to licensees in a given band, according to what is needed for the service in question.

The determination of frequencies used by licensees is done through frequency allocation, which in the United States is specified by the FCC in a table of allotments. The FCC is authorized to regulate spectrum access for private and government uses; however, the National Telecommunications and Information Administration of the Commerce Department allocates spectrum for use by the federal government (including the military).

In some cases (e.g. CB radio, Wi-Fi), the public may use spectrum without a license. Commercial users (such as television, AM/FM radio, and some types of two-way communications) will receive an FCC assignment to a portion of spectrum, which may be a single frequency or a band of frequencies. In issuing broadcast licenses the FCC relies on "comparative hearings", whereby the most qualified user will be granted use of the spectrum to best serve the public interest; researchers have pointed out that this procedure favors incumbents.

Violation of the terms of a license (due to technical fault or illegal content) may result in fines or revocation of the license. Licenses have also been jeopardized by misrepresentation on the part of the holder or failure to keep a public file (in the U.S. and Canada). Unlicensed broadcasting refers to legal devices allowed to transmit at low power without a license and pirate stations, which violate the law.

== Economics ==
In the American broadcast licenses were issued for only a nominal payment, but economist Ronald Coase challenged the FCC's approach. Coase proposed that, as for other resources (land, metal, etc.), the market should regulate the use of radio spectrum. This proposition is based on the Coase theorem: with well-defined property rights, the free market will allocate resources to their most efficient use if transaction costs are low. Coase's theory indicated that broadcast licenses in a spectrum that was limited had high economic value, which should be paid on the open market. Licenses are increasingly offered via spectrum auctions; however, this fails to consider non-commercial educational users (who are shut out of the process for economic reasons).

Licensing is conducted by a broadcasting authority (a government agency) to manage the radio-frequency spectrum and implement public policy, such as that regarding the concentration of media ownership. In the U.S. the Federal Communications Commission (FCC) does not assign licenses to exclusive users, instead permitting qualified users to apply for a license. The Radio Act of 1927 established the regulatory premise that the spectrum belongs to the public, and licensees have no property rights to use it. Although the spectrum is licensed to bidders, its purchase does not entail ownership or rights but the privilege of using that portion of the spectrum.

== Process ==
The process of obtaining a new broadcast license may be lengthy. A broadcast engineer first determines an available frequency, which may be unavailable in a crowded media market (such as a metropolitan area). If a frequency is available, an engineering study is submitted with an application to the broadcasting authority, to demonstrate that the licensee will not cause RF interference to existing stations. There is a limited term for the license, once acquired. According to the United States Government Printing Office in 1997, the term could exceed 8 years; however, this has been shortened to five years or less (depending on whether the FCC requires further evaluation).

A construction permit is first issued, with the license receiving approval when the station certifies that the permit has been executed (after testing to ensure that all parameters are within allowable tolerances). Once a facility is built and operational, it may be allowed to operate under program test authority until the license is issued (or denied). Where a station is close to an international border, a license may also need to be approved by the foreign country's broadcasting authority for frequency coordination. This is done even if the border is outside of a station's predicted broadcast range, since radio propagation sometimes causes stations to be heard outside their service area.

Existing stations apply for permits and license amendments when making changes to their facilities (such as relocation to another site, changing the radio antenna height, making changes to a directional antenna's radiation pattern, or when adding—or converting to—digital broadcasting). Other situations (such as a change in the city of license) are covered in rulemaking proceedings in the U.S., which may be a prerequisite to moving a station a significant distance (leaving its original community outside its new coverage area). Temporary situations are covered by special temporary authority (STA) to operate at a variance from the license or permit or a restricted service licence (RSL) to operate for a fixed period at reduced power. While these are FCC and Ofcom terms, respectively, other countries have similar regulations.

In the U.S., court cases can prolong the process when mutually exclusive applications are received. The FCC opens application window periods of about a week. Some applications have been pending for years; others end up in administrative law courts or arbitration, sometimes with one applicant seeking a buyout of another.

== Technical specifications ==
Management of technical specifications (such as those in broadcast television systems) is normally undertaken as a part of broadcast licensing in each country. Radio bands carry signals (such as video and audio, digital and analog, narrowband, broadband and content), and are licensed differently.

The broadcast license typically specifies the following minimum information:

- Geographic coordinates, with exact latitude and longitude
- Carrier frequency and bandwidth
- Modulation type[s]
- Effective radiated power (ERP)
- Height above average terrain (HAAT)
- Directional antenna radiation pattern, specified at several azimuths

Additionally, it often specifies:

- Operating hours (for mediumwave and shortwave)
- Transmitter power output (TPO) (before any attenuation or gain)
- Broadcast auxiliary services (BAS) linking studio and transmitter sites
- Antenna brand and model
- Height above mean sea level (AMSL) and above ground level (AGL)
- Backup facilities (which may have separate licenses)
- Additional service authorizations (subcarriers, digital radio)

Some countries (such as the Canadian Radio-television and Telecommunications Commission in Canada) specify radio format or the genre of television programming, to ensure diversity. Community stations (such as class A television service and LPFM stations in the U.S.) may be required to broadcast local content each week. U.S. broadcast translator licenses prohibit local content on FM, while LPTV stations can choose, except those tied to a DTV station as a fill-in translator or booster to overcome the shortcomings of the ATSC system mandated by the FCC.

== Sharing ==
In some cases, two stations may share the same frequency in the same area, or even the same facility. Time sharing has on occasion been used when two applicants have an equal number of points, mainly with LPFM stations. In FCC auction 1000 for the 600 MHz band, TV stations were paid to leave the air in crowded markets (to facilitate repacking of stations on TV channels 38 to 51 into those already using 2 to 36), but are allowed to move the license to another existing station, keeping their virtual channel numbers and must-carry rights. Each licensee is responsible for the content on their own channels, while both are jointly responsible for the technical operation of the transmitter, antenna, and tower.

In the city of New York, 89.1 MHz is reserved for the United Nations; however, it is used instead by WNYU-FM and WNYU-FM1, unless the U.N. should ever apply to use it.

== Renewal ==
Licensing requirements differ for public radio and television and for community radio and television compared to commercial applicants. Licensees must be aware of deadlines, from original application to renewal, which vary by state and include license expiration and dates for renewals. The form for renewal of a broadcast license in the United States is FCC Form 303-S. While the Form 303-S License Application consists of yes-or-no questions and certifications, the process of renewing the license is complex; the FCC requires that licensees certify that they were in compliance with all rules and regulations during the prior license term. If a license has been acquired in the middle of a term, the licensee will be evaluated from that point to the end of the license term. Misrepresentation to the FCC may lead to the loss of a license.

== See also ==
- Broadcasting in the Soviet Union
- Public service broadcasting in the United Kingdom
- Spectrum management
- Frequency assignment authority
- 1939 Temporary shutdown of BBC Television Service
- Rede Tupi
- NTV (Russia)
- NTV affair
- RCTV
- 2007 Venezuelan RCTV protests
- ATV
- 1972 Martial law under Ferdinand Marcos
- Banahaw Broadcasting Corporation
- ABS-CBN franchise renewal controversy - an issue where its application for broadcast license were denied due to "politically motivated" issues
- Tongyang Broadcasting Company
