= DBFS (disambiguation) =

DBFS or dBFS can refer to:

- Databricks File System, a distributed file system used for storing and querying data in Databricks
- Decibels relative to full scale, a unit of measurement for amplitude levels in digital systems which have a defined maximum peak level
- Oracle Database File System, a file system interface on top of Oracle Database tables for storage of XML files, later renamed Oracle Content Management SDK.
