= Facility ID =

Unique number for broadcast station in the United States

The facility ID number, also called a FIN or facility identifier, is a unique integer number of one to six digits, assigned by the U.S. Federal Communications Commission (FCC) Media Bureau to each broadcast station in the FCC Consolidated Database System (CDBS) and Licensing and Management System (LMS) databases, among others.

Because CDBS includes information about foreign stations which are notified to the U.S. under the terms of international frequency coordination agreements, FINs are also assigned to affected foreign stations. However, this has no legal significance, and the numbers are not used by the regulatory authorities in those other countries.

Current FCC practice is to assign facility ID numbers sequentially, but this is not an official requirement, so third-party users must not rely on it. Unlike call signs, however, the FIN associated with a particular station never changes; thus, the FCC staff and interested parties can be certain to which station an application pertains, even if it has changed its call sign since the application was originally filed. (The previous FCC database system, the Broadcast Application Processing System or BAPS, did not have such an identifier.)

In several cases, television stations have swapped facilities, and thus their FIN numbers, as what occurred in 1995 in Miami, when NBC-owned station WTVJ swapped channels with CBS's WCIX-TV (after the swap, WFOR-TV); NBC thus took the FIN and transmitter formerly associated with WCIX-TV, while WFOR-TV continues to operate under the FIN originally established for WTVJ.
