= Noise spectral density =

Noise power per unit of bandwidth

In communications, noise spectral density (NSD), noise power density, noise power spectral density, or simply noise density (N_{0}) is the power spectral density of noise or the noise power per unit of bandwidth. It has dimension of power over frequency, whose SI unit is watt per hertz (W/Hz), equivalent to watt-second (W ⋅ s) or joule (J). It is commonly used in link budgets as the denominator of the important figure-of-merit ratios, such as carrier-to-noise-density ratio as well as E_{b}/N_{0} and E_{s}/N_{0}.

If the noise is one-sided white noise, i.e., constant with frequency, then the total noise power N integrated over a bandwidth B is N = BN_{0} (for double-sided white noise, the bandwidth is doubled, so N is BN_{0}/2). This is utilized in signal-to-noise ratio calculations.

For thermal noise, its spectral density is given by N_{0} = kT, where k is the Boltzmann constant in joules per kelvin (J/K), and T is the receiver system noise temperature in kelvins.

The noise amplitude spectral density is the square root of the noise power spectral density, and is given in units such as volts per square root of hertz, $\mathrm{V}/\sqrt{\mathrm{Hz}}$.

== See also ==
- Noise-equivalent bandwidth
- Spectral density estimation
- Welch's method
