= Co-channel interference =

Crosstalk from two radio transmitters on one channel

Co-channel interference or CCI is crosstalk from two different radio transmitters using the same channel. Co-channel interference can be caused by many factors from weather conditions to administrative and design issues. Co-channel interference may be controlled by various radio resource management schemes.

== Cellular mobile networks ==
In cellular mobile communication (GSM & LTE Systems, for instance), frequency spectrum is a precious resource which is divided into non-overlapping spectrum bands which are assigned to different cells (In cellular communications, a cell refers to the hexagonal/circular area around the base station antenna). However, after certain geographical distance, these frequency bands are re-used, i.e. the same spectrum bands are reassigned to other distant cells. The co-channel interference arises in the cellular mobile networks owing to this phenomenon of frequency reuse. Thus, besides the intended signal from within the cell, signals at the same frequencies (co-channel signals) arrive at the receiver from the undesired transmitters located (far away) in some other cells and lead to deterioration in receiver performance.

== Adverse weather conditions ==
For FM, vertical layering of moisture content and temperature in the atmosphere (inversion layers) can occasionally cause signals to travel hundreds or thousands of kilometers further than usual. An inversion layer (or duct) is most commonly observed over high pressure regions and may affect radio signals for several hours to several days. The phenomenon is commonly referred to as anomalous propagation and is more likely in hot, dry weather in late summer.

== Poor frequency planning ==
Poor planning of frequencies by broadcasters can cause CCI, although this is rare. A very localized example is Listowel in the south-west of Ireland. The 2RN UHF television transmitter systems in Listowel and Knockmoyle (near Tralee) are on the same frequencies but with opposite polarization. However, in some outskirts of Listowel town, both transmitters can be picked up causing heavy CCI. This problem forces residents in these areas to use alternative transmitters to receive RTÉ programming.

== Overly-crowded radio spectrum ==
In many populated areas, there just isn't much room in the radio spectrum. Stations will be jam-packed in, sometimes to the point that one can hear loud and clear two, three, or more stations on the same frequency, at once. In the USA, the Federal Communications Commission (FCC) propagation models used to space stations on the same frequency are not always accurate in prediction of signals and interference. An example of this situation is in some parts of Fayetteville, Arkansas, the local 99.5 FM KAKS is displaced by KXBL 99.5 FM in Tulsa, Oklahoma, particularly on the west side of significant hills. Another example would be of Ashtabula's WKKY 104.7 having interference from Toledo's WIOT 104.7 FM on the Ontario shore of Lake Erie, as well as Woodstock's CIHR-FM (on rare occasions), which is also on 104.7 FM, due to the signals traveling very far across Lake Erie. The interference to WIOT from the operation of W284BQ, translator, has been resolved by the FCC. Effective October 18, 2011, it must cease operation.

== Daytime vs nighttime ==
In the medium frequency portion of the radio spectrum where most AM broadcasting is allocated, signals propagate full-time via groundwave and, at nighttime, via skywave as well. This means that during the nighttime hours, co-channel interference exists on many AM radio frequencies due to the medium waves reflecting off the ionosphere and being bounced back down to earth. In the United States, Canada, Mexico, and the Bahamas, there are international agreements on certain frequencies which allocate "clear-channel" broadcasting for certain stations to either have their respective frequencies to themselves at night, or to share their respective frequencies with other stations located over hundreds or even thousands of miles away. On other frequencies, there are "Regional Channels" where most stations on these frequencies either reduce power or change to a directional antenna system at nighttime to help reduce co-channel interference to each other's signals. In the United States, there are six "Local Channel" frequencies, also known as "graveyarders" where nearly every station on those frequencies has the same power and antenna pattern both day and night and, as a result of skywave propagation, there is normally massive co-channel interference in rural areas on these frequencies, often making it difficult, if not impossible, to understand what's being said on the nearest local station on the respective channel, or the other distant stations which are bouncing on the same channel, during the nighttime hours. Skywave has been used for long distance AM radio reception since radio's inception and should not be construed as a negative aspect of AM radio. FCC deregulation allowed many new AM radio stations on the former clear and regional channel designations; this is the principal cause of overcrowding on the AM band at night. A new source of interference on the AM broadcast band is the new digital broadcast system called HD, any AM station that broadcasts HD superimposes digital "hash" on its adjacent channels. This is especially apparent at night as some stations, for example WBZ transmits its 30 kHz wide signal for hundreds of miles at night causing documented interference and covering another station on an adjoining frequency (WYSL 1040) as far as 400 miles away.

== Cancellation of signal ==
In addition, many AM stations, including but not limited to the clear channel-stations, often experience cancellation of their own signals within the inner and outer fringes of their normal groundwave coverage areas at nighttime due to the stations' individual skywave signals reaching the listeners' receivers at or near equal strength to the stations' individual groundwave signals; this phenomenon is very similar to the multipath interference experienced on FM Radio in the VHF band within mountainous regions and urban areas due to signals bouncing off of mountains, buildings, and other structures, except that the groundwave-skywave cancellation occurs almost exclusively at nighttime when skywave propagation is present.

== Bleeding of adjacent bands ==
Even with frequency planning, bleeding of signals from adjacent bands can lead to interference. This can impair passive remote sensing used for environmental monitoring, such as by weather satellites. The advent of 5G may significantly increase deleterious effects on satellites which would impair numerical weather prediction performance, resulting in substantially adverse economic and public safety impacts. Due to such concerns, US Secretary of Commerce Wilbur Ross and NASA Administrator Jim Bridenstine in February 2019 urged the FCC to cancel proposed spectrum bidding, which this was rejected. Unlicensed operations or poorly regulated bands also can lead to interference.

== See also ==
- Adjacent-channel interference
- Broadcast signal intrusion
- Signal-to-interference ratio (SIR or S/I), also known as Carrier-to-interference ratio (CIR or C/I)
- Frequency coordination
