= Decibel watt =

SI measurement of signal strength and intensity

The decibel watt (dBW or dB_{W}) is a unit for the measurement of the strength of a signal expressed in decibels relative to one watt. It is used because of its capability to express both very large and very small values of power in a short range of number; e.g., 1 milliwatt = −30 dBW, 1 watt = 0 dBW, 10 watts = 10 dBW, 100 watts = 20 dBW, and 1,000,000 W = 60 dBW.

$$\mbox{Power in dBW} = 10 \log_{10}\frac{\mbox{Power}}{ 1 \mathrm{W}}$$

and also

$$\mbox{Power in W} = 10^{\frac{\mbox{Power in dBW}}{10}}$$

Compare dBW to dBm, which is referenced to one milliwatt (0.001 W).

A given dBW value expressed in dBm is always 30 more because 1 watt is 1,000 milliwatts, and a ratio of 1,000 (in power) is 30 dB; e.g., 10 dBm (10 mW) is equal to −20 dBW (0.01 W).

In the SI system the non SI modifier decibel (dB) is not permitted for use directly alongside SI units so the dBW is not directly permitted but 10 dBW may be written 10 dB (1 watt).

== See also ==
- dBm
