= Alignment level =

Nominal signal level in an audio signal chain

The alignment level in an audio signal chain or on an audio recording is a defined anchor point that represents a reasonable or typical level.

== Analogue ==
In analogue systems, alignment level in broadcast chains is commonly 0 dBu (0.775 volts RMS) and in professional audio is commonly 0 VU (4 dBu, 1.228 volts RMS). Under normal situations, the 0 VU reference allows for a headroom of 18 dB or more above the reference level without significant distortion. This is largely due to the use of slow-responding VU meters in almost all analogue professional audio equipment, which, by their design and by specification, respond to an average level, not peak levels.

== Digital ==
In digital systems alignment level commonly is at −18 dBFS (18 dB below digital full scale), in accordance with EBU recommendations. Digital equipment must use peak-reading metering systems to avoid severe digital distortion caused by the signal going beyond digital full scale. 24-bit original or master recordings commonly have an alignment level at −24 dBFS to allow extra headroom, which can then be reduced to match the available headroom of the final medium by audio level compression. FM broadcasts usually have only 9 dB of headroom, as recommended by the EBU, but digital broadcasts, which could operate with 18 dB of headroom, given their low noise floor even in difficult reception areas, currently operate in a state of confusion, with some transmitting at maximum level, while others operate at a much lower level, even though they carry material that has been compressed for compatibility with the lower dynamic range of FM transmissions.

== EBU ==
In EBU documents alignment level defines −18 dBFS as the level of the alignment signal, a 1 kHz sine tone for analog applications and 997 Hz in digital applications.

== Motivation ==
Using alignment level rather than maximum permitted level as the reference point allows more sensible headroom management throughout the audio signal chain; compression happens only where intended.

Loudness wars have resulted in increasing playback loudness. Loudness normalisation to a fixed alignment level can improve the experience when listening to mixed material.

== See also ==
- Audio normalization
- Full scale
- Nominal level
- Transmission-level point
