= Antenna factor =

Characteristic of a radio antenna

In electromagnetics, the antenna factor (AF, units: m^{−1}, reciprocal meter) is defined as the ratio of the electric field E (units: V/m or μV/m) to the voltage V (units: V or μV) induced across the terminals of an antenna:

$$AF = \frac{E}{V}$$

If all quantities are expressed logarithmically in decibels instead of SI units, the above equation becomes

$$AF_{\mathrm{dB/m}} = E_\mathrm{\mathrm{dBV/m}} - V_{\mathrm{dBV}}$$

The voltage measured at the output terminals of an antenna is not the actual field intensity due to actual antenna gain, aperture characteristics, and loading effects.

For a magnetic field, with units of A/m, the corresponding antenna factor is in units of A/(V⋅m). For the relationship between the electric and magnetic fields, see the impedance of free space.

For a 50 Ω load, knowing that P_{D} A_{e} = P_{r} = V^{2}/R and E^{2}= $\sqrt{\frac{\mu_0}{\varepsilon_0}}$P_{D} ~ 377P_{D} (E and V noted here are the RMS values averaged over time), the antenna factor is developed as:

$$AF =
\frac{\sqrt{377 P_D}}{\sqrt{50 P_D A_e}} =
\frac{2.75}{\sqrt{A_e}} =
\frac{9.73}{\lambda \sqrt{G} }$$

Where

- A_{e} = (λ^{2}G)/4π : the antenna effective aperture
- P_{D} is the power density in watts per unit area
- P_{r} is the power delivered into the load resistance presented by the receiver (normally 50 ohms)
- G: the antenna gain
- $\mu_0$ is the magnetic constant
- $\varepsilon_0$ is the electric constant

For antennas which are not defined by a physical area, such as monopoles and dipoles consisting of thin rod conductors, the effective length (units: meter) is used to measure the ratio between voltage and electric field.

== See also ==
- Antenna effective length
