= SNDR =

Signal-to-noise and distortion ratio

Signal-to-noise and distortion ratio (SNDR) is a term used for a set of measures of the quality of a signal from a communications device. These include SINAD and SINADR.

== SINAD ==
The signal-to-noise and distortion ratio (SINAD) is a measure of the quality of a signal from a communications device, often defined as

$$\mathrm{SINAD} = 10\log_{10} \frac{P_\text{signal} + P_\text{noise} + P_\text{distortion}}{P_\text{noise} + P_\text{distortion}},$$

where $P$ is the average power of the signal, noise and distortion components. The noise power term can include both thermal noise and quantization noise. SINAD is usually expressed in dB and is quoted alongside the receiver RF sensitivity, to give a quantitative evaluation of the receiver sensitivity. Note that with this definition, unlike SNR, a SINAD reading can never be less than 1 (i.e. it is always positive when quoted in dB).

When calculating the distortion, it is common to exclude the DC components.

Due to widespread use, SINAD has collected several different definitions. SINAD is commonly defined as:

1. The ratio of (a) total received power, i.e., the signal to (b) the noise-plus-distortion power. This is modeled by the equation above.
2. The ratio of (a) the power of a test signal, i.e. a sine wave, to (b) the residual received power, i.e. noise-plus-distortion power. With this definition, it is possible to have a SINAD level less than one. This definition is used in the calculation of effective number of bits (ENOB) for DACs and ADCs.

Information on the relations between SINAD, ENOB, SNR, THD and SFDR can be found in the footnotes of this article.

=== Commercial radio specifications ===
A typical example, quoted from a commercial hand held VHF or UHF radio, might be:

Receiver sensitivity: 0.25 μV at 12 dB SINAD.

This is stating that the receiver will produce intelligible speech with a signal at its input as low as 0.25 μV. Radio receiver designers will test the product in a laboratory using a procedure, which is typically as follows:

- With no signal present on the input, the noise and distortion of the receiver are measured at a convenient level.
- A signal is applied to the input such that the output increases by 12 dB.
- The level of the signal needed to produce this is noted. In this case, it was found to be 0.25 microvolts.

According to the radio designer, intelligible speech can be detected 12 dB above the receiver's noise floor (noise and distortion). Regardless of the accuracy of this output power in regards to intelligible speech, having a standard output SINAD allows easy comparison between radio receiver input sensitivities. This 0.25 μV value is typical for VHF commercial radio, while 0.35 μV is probably more typical for UHF. In the real world, lower SINAD values (more noise) can still result in intelligible speech, but it is tiresome work to listen to a voice in that much noise.

== SINADR ==
Signal-to-noise and distortion ratio (SINADR) is a measurement of the purity of a signal. SINADR is typically used in data converter specifications. SINADR is defined as:

$$\mathrm{SINADR} = \frac{P_\mathrm{signal}}{P_\mathrm{quantizationError} + P_\mathrm{randomNoise} + P_\mathrm{distortion}}$$

where $P$ is the average power of the signal, quantization error, random noise and distortion components. SINADR is usually expressed in dB. SINADR is a standard metric for analog-to-digital converter and digital-to-analog converter.

SINADR (in dB) is related to effective number of bits (ENOB) by the following equation:

$$\mathrm{SINADR} = ENOB\cdot 6.02 + 1.76$$

== See also ==
- Signal-to-noise ratio
- Total harmonic distortion (THD+N)
