= DBm0 =

dBm0 is an abbreviation for the power in decibel-milliwatts (dBm) measured at a zero transmission level point (ZLP).

dBm0 is a concept used (amongst other areas) in audio/telephony processing since it allows a smooth integration of analog and digital chains. Notably, for A-law and μ-law codecs the standards define a sequence which has a 0 dBm0 output. (Note: A consequence for the A-law and μ-law codecs of the 0 dBm0 definition is that they have a respective 3.14 dBm0 and 3.17 dBm0 maximum signal level (ratio between the maximum obtainable sine wave amplitude and the specified reference 0 dBm0 sine wave amplitude).) (Note: 0 dBm0 is often replaced by or used instead of digital milliwatt or zero transmission level point.)

The unit dBm0 is used to describe levels of digital as well as analog signals and is derived from its counterpart dBm. Although today dBm0 may be considered supplanted by the similar unit decibels relative to full scale (dBFS) (discussion at § Comparison to dBFS), dBm0 can be viewed as connecting both the old world of analog telecommunication and the new world of digital communication. The 0 dBm0 level corresponds to the digital milliwatt (DMW) and is defined as the absolute power level at a digital reference point of the same signal that would be measured as the absolute power level, in dBm, if the reference point was analog.

The absolute power in dBm scale for a power P in milliwatts (mW) is defined as:
$$10 \log_{10} \frac{P}{1~\text{[mW]}} \, .$$
When the test impedance is 600 Ω resistive, 0 dBm can be referred to a voltage of 775 mV, which results in a reference active power of 1 mW. Then 0 dBm0 corresponds to an overload level of approximately 3 dBm in the analog-to-digital conversion.

Given a sinusoid signal of 0.775 V RMS, the power at a zero transmission level point is:

$$P = \frac{(0.775 [\mathrm{V}])^2}{600 [\Omega]} = 0.001 [\mathrm{W}] = 1 [\mathrm{mW}] = 0 [\mathrm{dBm}]\,,$$

and the voltage level at the ZLP is:

$$L = 10*\log_{10}\left( \frac{0.775 [\mathrm{V}]}{1 [\mathrm{V}]} \right)^2 \approx -2.214 [\mathrm{dBV}].$$

TIA-810 characterizes:

When a 0.775 volt RMS analog signal is applied to the coder input, a 0 dBm0 digital code is present at the digital reference. In general, when a 0 dBm0 digital code is applied to the decoder, a 0.775 volt RMS analog signal appears at the decoder output. More specifically, when the 0 dBm0 periodic sequence as given in Table 2, in either mu-law or A-law as appropriate, is applied to the decoder at the digital reference point, a 1 kHz, 0.775 volt RMS sine-wave signal appears at the decoder output. 0 dBm0 is 3.14 (A-law) or 3.17 (mu-law) dB below digital full scale.

In all standards, dBm0 is always an RMS unit. Peaks are described in a different way, sometimes by mentioning the margin to overload or clipping.

The nominal downlink level in mobile phone telecommunication at the point of interconnection is −16 dBm0.

== Comparison to dBFS ==
Digital signals in the abstract digital realm do not necessarily inherently represent any type of measurable physical unit. They are not necessarily relative to any specific reference power level, and thus they need not be expressed as dBm0. But the early pioneers of telephonometry gave us the pseudo-digital unit of dBm0, which persists.

A more commonly used unit today for digital signal levels is dB Full Scale or dBFS. The relationship between dBm0 and dBFS is unfortunately ambiguous. It depends how RMS and peak levels in dBFS are defined.

The ambiguity is if a full scale sinusoidal in a digital system is defined to have an RMS level of −3 dBFS RMS or if it should be defined to have a RMS value of 0 dBFS RMS, equal to the dBFS peak value. Today, the interpretation by many companies tend to go towards a definition that a full scale sinusoidal is −3 dBFS RMS and 0 dBFS peak. The only signal that can hold 0 dBFS RMS according to this definition, is a fully saturated square wave. For the relationship between dBm0 and dBFS, this means that +3.14 dBm0 is equivalent to 0 dBFS peak and −3 dBFS RMS.

This also means that the commonly used POI (Point of Interconnect) level of −16 dBm0 can be transformed to −22.14 dBFS RMS in an A-law codec system, or −22.17 dBFS RMS in a μ-law codec system (using the definition of a full scale sinusoidal being −3 dBFS RMS and 0 dBFS peak.

Though, there are some companies defining that dBFS RMS equals dBFS peak for sinusoidal signals. Examples are: Qualcomm and Knowles (and other digital MEMS microphone companies). This gives some consequences when trying to calculate crest factors for speech or noise, because the difference between peak and rms value in analog domain does not correspond to the difference between peak and rms level in digital domain.

Other companies like Adobe (software creator of Adobe Audition) and Listen Inc. (software creator of SoundCheck) offer the possibility to choose which dBFS rms definition you want to use in the program.

== Sources ==
- ETSI
- G.711
