= Knockmoyle transmitting station =

TV, radio transmitter near Tralee, Ireland

Knockmoyle
- Location within Ireland
- Location: Tralee, County Kerry
- Coordinates: 52.212°N 9.712°W

Knockmoyle transmitting station is a transmission site located in the Slieve Mish mountains near Tralee, County Kerry, Ireland. It is one of the busiest transmitting sites in County Kerry, and is home to numerous masts and services.

== Transmissions ==
=== Digital television ===
Frequency	UHF	kW	Operator
498.000	33	1	Saorview (Mux 1)
474.000	36	1	Saorview (Mux 2)

=== Analogue radio ===
Frequency	kW	Service
88.4 MHz	1	RTÉ Radio 1
90.6 MHz	1	RTÉ 2fm
92.8 MHz	1	RTÉ Raidió na Gaeltachta
97.2 MHz	0.3	Radio Kerry
98.0 MHz	1	RTÉ lyric fm
100.2 MHz	1	Today FM
102.5 MHz	2.5	Spin South West
107.2 MHz	3	Newstalk
