= DBFS =

Unit of measurement for amplitude levels in digital systems

Clipping of a digital waveform. The red lines indicate full scale, and the waveform is shown before and after hard clipping (grey and black outlines respectively).

dBFS or dB FS (decibels relative to full scale) is a unit of measurement for amplitude levels in digital systems, such as pulse-code modulation (PCM), which have a defined maximum peak level. The unit is similar to the units dBov and decibels relative to overload (dBO).

The level of 0 dBFS is assigned to the maximum possible digital level. For example, a signal that reaches 50% of the maximum level has a level of −6 dBFS, which is 6 dB below full scale. Conventions differ for root mean square (RMS) measurements, but all peak measurements smaller than the maximum are negative levels.

A digital signal that does not contain any samples at 0 dBFS can still clip when converted to analog form due to the signal reconstruction process interpolating between samples. This can be prevented by careful digital-to-analog converter circuit design. Measurements of the true inter-sample peak levels are notated as dBTP or dB TP (decibels true peak).

== RMS levels ==
Since a peak measurement is not useful for qualifying the noise performance of a system, or measuring the loudness of an audio recording, for instance, RMS measurements are often used instead.

A potential for ambiguity exists when assigning a level on the dBFS scale to a waveform rather than to a specific amplitude, because some engineers follow the mathematical definition of RMS, which for sinusoidal signals is 3 dB below the peak value, while others choose the reference level so that RMS and peak measurements of a sine wave produce the same result.

dBFS is defined in AES Standard AES17-1998, IEC 61606, and ITU-T Recs. P.381 and P.382, such that the RMS value of a full-scale sine wave is designated 0 dB FS. This means a full-scale square wave would have an RMS value of +3 dB FS. This convention is used in Wolfson and Cirrus Logic digital microphone specs, etc.

dBov is defined in the ITU-T G.100.1 telephony standard such that the RMS value of a full-scale square wave is designated 0 dBov. All possible dBov measurements are negative numbers, and a sine wave cannot exist at a larger RMS value than −3 dBov without clipping. This unit can be applied to both analog and digital systems. This convention is the basis for the ITU's LUFS loudness unit, and is also used in Sound Forge and Euphonix meters, and Analog Devices digital microphone specs (though referred to as "dBFS").

== Dynamic range ==
The measured dynamic range (DR) of a digital system is the ratio of the full scale signal level to the RMS noise floor. The theoretical minimum noise floor is caused by quantization noise. This is usually modeled as a uniform random fluctuation between −1/2 LSB and +1/2 LSB. (Only certain signals produce uniform random fluctuations, so this model is typically, but not always, accurate.)

As the dynamic range is measured relative to the RMS level of a full scale sine wave, the dynamic range and the level of this quantization noise in dBFS can both be estimated with the same formula (though with reversed sign):

$$\mathrm{DR} = \mathrm{SNR} = 20\log_{10}{\left(2^n \sqrt{\tfrac{3}{2}}\right)} \approx 6.0206 n + 1.761$$

The value of n equals the resolution of the system in bits or the resolution of the system minus 1 bit (the measure error). For example, a 16-bit system has a theoretical minimum noise floor of −98.09 dBFS relative to a full-scale sine wave:

$$\mathrm{DR} = \mathrm{SNR} = 20\log_{10}{\left(2^{16} \sqrt{\tfrac{3}{2}}\right)} \approx 6.0206 \cdot 16 + 1.761 \approx 98.09\,$$

In any real converter, dither is added to the signal before sampling. This removes the effects of non-uniform quantization error, but increases the minimum noise floor.

== History ==
The phrase "dB below full scale" has appeared in print since the 1950s, and the term "dBFS" has been used since 1977.

Although the decibel (dB) is permitted for use alongside units of the International System of Units (SI), the dBFS is not.

The CD-DA Red Book (1980) standard defined the maximum loudness should be 0 dBFS.

== Analog levels ==
dBFS is not defined for analog levels, according to standard AES-6id-2006. No single standard converts between digital and analog levels, mostly due to the differing capabilities of different equipment. The amount of oversampling also affects the conversion with values that are too low having significant error. The conversion level is chosen as the best compromise for the typical headroom and signal-to-noise levels of the equipment in question. Examples:

- EBU R68 is used in most European countries, specifying +18 dBu at 0 dBFS.
- In Europe, the EBU recommend that −18 dBFS equates to the alignment level.
  - UK broadcasters, alignment level is taken as 0 dBu (PPM 4 or −4 VU)
  - The American SMPTE standard defines −20 dBFS as the alignment level.
- European and UK calibration for Post & Film is −18 dBFS = 0 VU.
- US installations use +24 dBu for 0 dBFS.
- American and Australian Post: −20 dBFS = 0 VU = +4 dBu.
- In Japan, France, and some other countries, converters may be calibrated for +22 dBu at 0 dBFS.
- BBC specification: −18 dBFS = PPM "4" = 0 dBu
- German ARD and studio, PPM +6 dBu = −10 (−9) dBFS. +16 (+15) dBu = 0 dBFS. No VU.
- Belgium VRT: 0 dB (VRT ref.) = +6 dBu; −9 dBFS = 0 dB (VRT ref.); 0 dBFS = +15 dBu.

== See also ==
- Audio bit depth – Number of bits of information recorded for each digital audio sample
- Bit rate – Information transmission rate expressed in bits per second
- LUFS – Loudness measurement unit
