= Frequency coordination =

Process of mitigating interference between communications services

Frequency Coordination is a technical and regulatory process that removes or mitigates radio-frequency interference between different radio systems that operate on the same frequency.

Normally frequency coordination is a function of an administration, such as a governmental spectrum regulator, as part of a formal regulatory process under the procedures of the Radio Regulations (an intergovernmental treaty text that regulates the radio frequency spectrum).

Before an administrations lets an operator operate a new radio communications network, it must undergo coordination in the following steps:

- Inform other operators about the plans
- Receive comments if appropriate
- Conduct technical discussions with priority networks
- Agree on technical and operational parameters
- Gain international recognition and protection on the Master International Frequency Register
- Bring the network into use

This coordination ensures that:

- All administrations know the technical plans of other administrations.
- All operators (satellite and terrestrial) can determine if unacceptable interference to existing and planned “priority” networks is likely, and have an opportunity to:
  - Object
  - Discuss and review
  - Reach technical and operational sharing agreements

Coordination is thus closely bound to date of protection or priority, defined by the date when the International Telecommunication Union receives complete coordination data. New planned networks must coordinate with all networks with an earlier date of protection but are protected against all networks with a later date of protection. Planned (but not implemented) networks acquire status under this procedure, but time limits ensure that protection does not last forever if networks are not implemented.

Congress Authorizes FCC

In 1982, the United States Congress provided the FCC with the authority to use frequency coordinators:

- Assist in developing and managing spectrum
- Recommend appropriate frequencies (designated under Part 90).

== List of Coordinators ==
For Public Safety frequency coordination -

- AASHTO
- APCO
- FCCA
- IMSA

For Business and special emergency -

- AAA
- AAR
- EWA
- FIT
- PCIA
- UTC
- Micronet Communications, Inc. - Since 1983
- Comsearch - Since 1977
