= Signal-to-noise ratio =

Ratio of the desired signal to the background noise

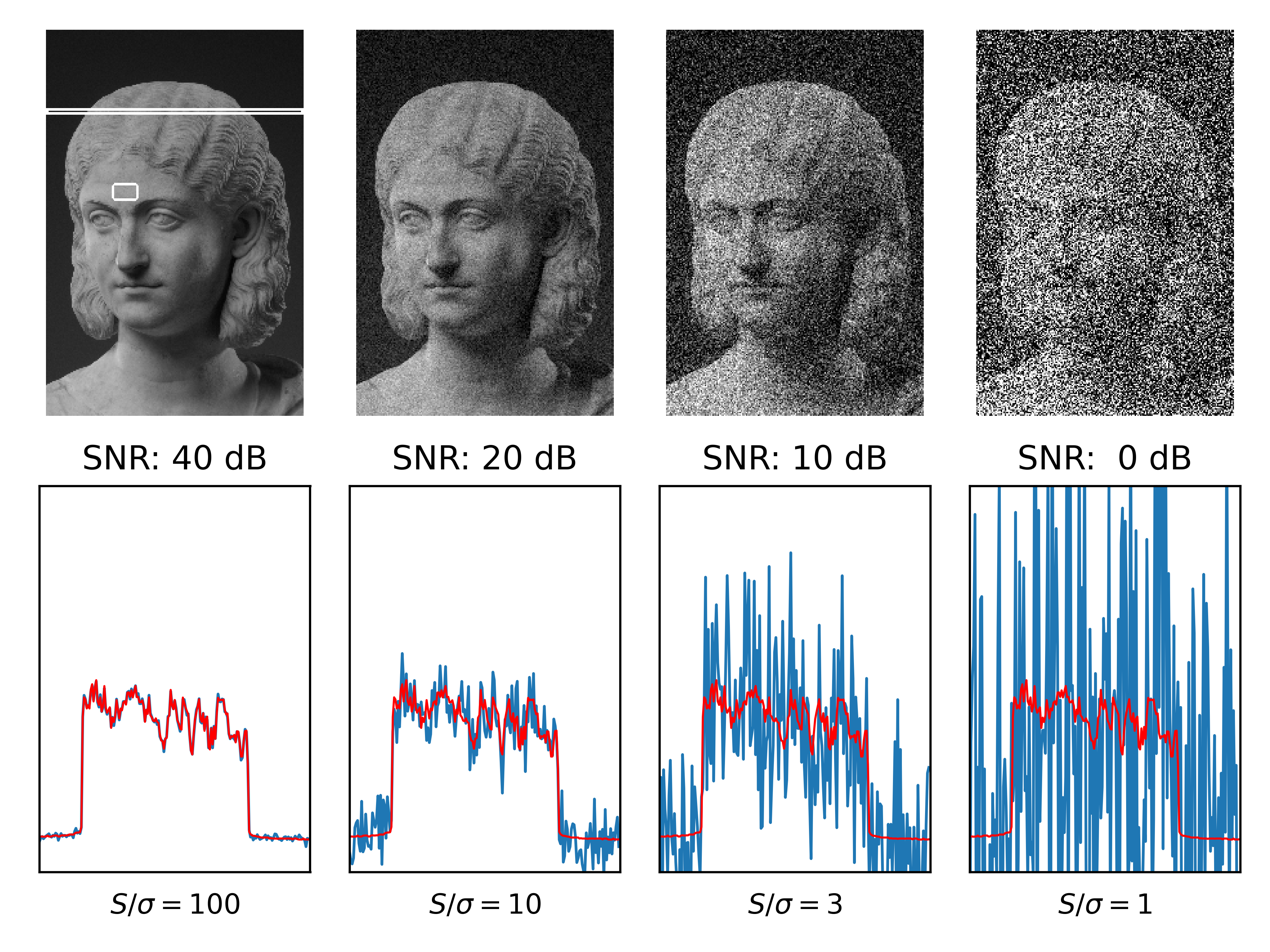
A gray-scale photograph with different signal-to-noise ratios (SNRs). The SNR values are given for the rectangular region on the forehead. The plots at the bottom show the signal intensity in the indicated row of the image (red: original signal, blue: with noise).

Signal-to-noise ratio (SNR or S/N) is a measure used in science and engineering that compares the level of a desired signal to the level of background noise. SNR is defined as the ratio of signal power to noise power, often expressed in decibels. A ratio higher than 1:1 (greater than 0 dB) indicates more signal than noise.

SNR is an important parameter that affects the performance and quality of systems that process or transmit signals, such as communication systems, audio equipment, radar systems, imaging systems, and data acquisition systems. A high SNR means that the signal is clear and easy to detect or interpret, while a low SNR means that the signal is corrupted or obscured by noise and may be difficult to distinguish or recover. SNR can be improved by various methods, such as increasing the signal strength, reducing the noise level, filtering out unwanted noise, or using error correction techniques.

SNR also determines the maximum possible amount of data that can be transmitted reliably over a given channel, which depends on its bandwidth and SNR. This relationship is described by the Shannon–Hartley theorem, which is a fundamental law of information theory.

SNR can be calculated using different formulas depending on how the signal and noise are measured and defined. The most common way to express SNR is in decibels, which is a logarithmic scale that makes it easier to compare large or small values. Other definitions of SNR may use different factors or bases for the logarithm, depending on the context and application.

== Definition ==
One definition of signal-to-noise ratio is the ratio of the power of a signal (meaningful input) to the power of background noise (meaningless or unwanted input):

$$\mathrm{SNR} = \frac{P_\mathrm{signal}}{P_\mathrm{noise}},$$

where P is average power. Both signal and noise power must be measured at the same or equivalent points in a system, and within the same system bandwidth.

The signal-to-noise ratio of a random variable (S) to random noise N is:

$$\mathrm{SNR} = \frac{\mathrm{E}[S^2]}{\mathrm{E}[N^2]} \, ,$$

where E refers to the expected value, which in this case is the mean square of N.

If the signal is simply a constant value of s, this equation simplifies to:

$$\mathrm{SNR} = \frac{s^2}{\mathrm{E}[N^2]} \, .$$

If the noise has expected value of zero, as is common, the denominator is its variance, the square of its standard deviation σ_{N}.

The signal and the noise must be measured the same way, for example, as voltages across the same impedance. Their root mean squares can alternatively be used according to:

$$\mathrm{SNR} = \frac{P_\mathrm{signal}}{P_\mathrm{noise}} = \left ( \frac{A_\mathrm{signal}}{A_\mathrm{noise} } \right )^2,$$

where A is root mean square (RMS) amplitude (for example, RMS voltage).

=== Decibels ===
Because many signals have a very wide dynamic range, signals are often expressed using the logarithmic decibel scale. Based upon the definition of decibel, signal and noise may be expressed in decibels (dB) as

$$P_\mathrm{signal,dB} = 10 \log_{10} \left ( P_\mathrm{signal} \right )$$

and

$$P_\mathrm{noise,dB} = 10 \log_{10} \left ( P_\mathrm{noise} \right ).$$

In a similar manner, SNR may be expressed in decibels as

$$\mathrm{SNR_{dB}} = 10 \log_{10} \left ( \mathrm{SNR} \right ).$$

Using the definition of SNR

$$\mathrm{SNR_{dB}} = 10 \log_{10} \left ( \frac{P_\mathrm{signal}}{P_\mathrm{noise}} \right ).$$

Using the quotient rule for logarithms

$$10 \log_{10} \left ( \frac{P_\mathrm{signal}}{P_\mathrm{noise}} \right ) = 10 \log_{10} \left ( P_\mathrm{signal} \right ) - 10 \log_{10} \left ( P_\mathrm{noise} \right ).$$

Substituting the definitions of SNR, signal, and noise in decibels into the above equation results in an important formula for calculating the signal-to-noise ratio in decibels, when the signal and noise are also in decibels:

$$\mathrm{SNR_{dB}} = {P_\mathrm{signal,dB} - P_\mathrm{noise,dB}}.$$

In the above formula, P is measured in units of power, such as watts (W) or milliwatts (mW), and the signal-to-noise ratio is a pure number.

However, when the signal and noise are measured in volts (V) or amperes (A), which are measures of amplitude, (Note: The connection between optical power and voltage in an imaging system is linear. This usually means that the SNR of the electrical signal is calculated by the 10 log rule. With an interferometric system, however, where interest lies in the signal from one arm only, the field of the electromagnetic wave is proportional to the voltage (assuming that the intensity in the second, the reference arm is constant). Therefore the optical power of the measurement arm is directly proportional to the electrical power and electrical signals from optical interferometry are following the 20 log rule.) they must first be squared to obtain a quantity proportional to power, as shown below:

$$\mathrm{SNR_{dB}} = 10 \log_{10} \left [ \left ( \frac{A_\mathrm{signal}}{A_\mathrm{noise}} \right )^2 \right ] = 20 \log_{10} \left ( \frac{A_\mathrm{signal}}{A_\mathrm{noise}} \right )  = {A_\mathrm{signal,dB} - A_\mathrm{noise,dB}} .$$

=== Dynamic range ===
The concepts of signal-to-noise ratio and dynamic range are closely related. Dynamic range measures the ratio between the strongest un-distorted signal on a channel and the minimum discernible signal, which, for most purposes, is the noise level. SNR measures the ratio between an arbitrary signal level (not necessarily the most powerful signal possible) and noise. Measuring signal-to-noise ratios requires the selection of a representative or reference signal. In audio engineering, the reference signal is usually a sine wave at a standardized nominal or alignment level, such as 1 kHz at +4 dBu (1.228 V_{RMS}).

SNR is usually taken to indicate an average signal-to-noise ratio, as it is possible that instantaneous signal-to-noise ratios will be considerably different. The concept can be understood as normalizing the noise level to 1 (0 dB) and measuring how far the signal 'stands out'.

=== Difference from conventional power ===
In physics, the average power of an AC signal is defined as the average value of voltage times current; for resistive (non-reactive) circuits, where voltage and current are in phase, this is equivalent to the product of the rms voltage and current:

$$\mathrm{P} = V_\mathrm{rms}I_\mathrm{rms}$$

$$\mathrm{P}= \frac{V_\mathrm{rms}^{2}}{R} = I_\mathrm{rms}^{2} R$$

But in signal processing and communication, one usually assumes that $R=1 \Omega$ so that factor is usually not included while measuring power or energy of a signal. This may cause some confusion among readers, but the resistance factor is not significant for typical operations performed in signal processing or for computing power ratios. For most cases, the power of a signal would be considered to be simply

$$\mathrm{P}= V_\mathrm{rms}^{2}$$

== Alternative definition ==
An alternative definition of SNR is as the reciprocal of the coefficient of variation, i.e., the ratio of mean to standard deviation of a signal or measurement:

$$\mathrm{SNR} = \frac{\mu}{\sigma}$$

where $\mu$ is the signal mean or expected value and $\sigma$ is the standard deviation of the noise, or an estimate thereof. (Note: The exact methods may vary between fields. For example, if the signal data are known to be constant, then $\sigma$ can be calculated using the standard deviation of the signal. If the signal data are not constant, then $\sigma$ can be calculated from data where the signal is zero or relatively constant.) Notice that such an alternative definition is only useful for variables that are always non-negative (such as photon counts and luminance), and it is only an approximation since $\operatorname{E}\left[X^2 \right] = \sigma^2 + \mu^2$. It is commonly used in image processing, where the SNR of an image is usually calculated as the ratio of the mean pixel value to the standard deviation of the pixel values over a given neighborhood.

Sometimes SNR is defined as the square of the alternative definition above, in which case it is equivalent to the more common definition:

$$\mathrm{SNR} = \frac{\mu^2}{\sigma^2}$$

This definition is closely related to the sensitivity index or d', when assuming that the signal has two states separated by signal amplitude $\mu$, and the noise standard deviation $\sigma$ does not change between the two states.

The Rose criterion (named after Albert Rose) states that an SNR of at least 5 is needed to be able to distinguish image features with certainty. An SNR less than 5 means less than 100% certainty in identifying image details.

Yet another alternative, very specific, and distinct definition of SNR is employed to characterize sensitivity of imaging systems; see Signal-to-noise ratio (imaging).

Related measures are the "contrast ratio" and the "contrast-to-noise ratio".

== Modulation system measurements ==
=== Amplitude modulation ===
Channel signal-to-noise ratio is given by

$$\mathrm{(SNR)_{C,AM}} = \frac{A_C^2 (1 + k_a^2 P)} {2 W N_0}$$

where W is the bandwidth and $k_a$ is modulation index

Output signal-to-noise ratio (of AM receiver) is given by

$$\mathrm{(SNR)_{O,AM}} = \frac{A_c^2 k_a^2 P} {2 W N_0}$$

=== Frequency modulation ===
Channel signal-to-noise ratio is given by

$$\mathrm{(SNR)_{C,FM}} = \frac{A_c^2} {2 W N_0}$$

Output signal-to-noise ratio is given by

$$\mathrm{(SNR)_{O,FM}} = \frac{A_c^2 k_f^2 P} {2 N_0 W^3}$$

== Noise reduction ==
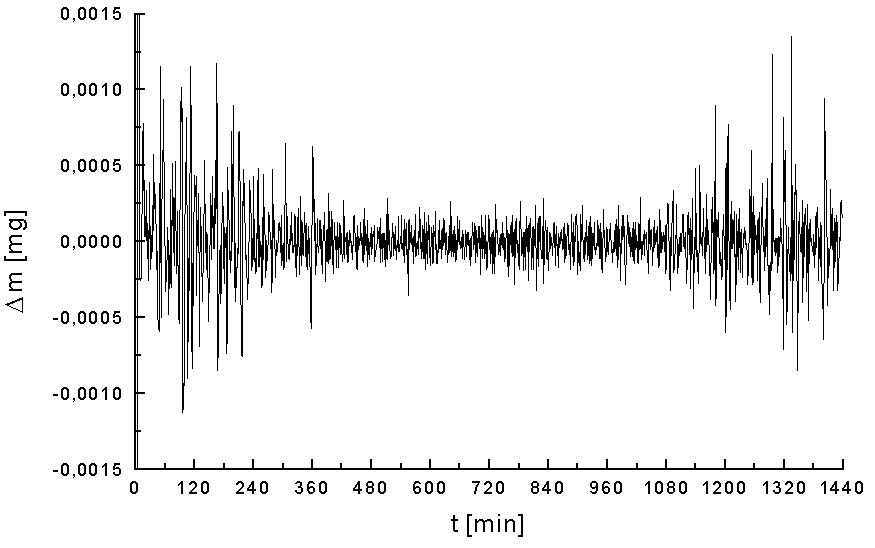
Recording from a thermogravimetric analysis device with poor mechanical isolation; the middle of the plot shows lower noise due to reduced human activity at night.

All real measurements are disturbed by noise. This includes electronic noise, but can also include external events that affect the measured phenomenon — wind, vibrations, the gravitational attraction of the moon, variations of temperature, variations of humidity, etc., depending on what is measured and of the sensitivity of the device. It is often possible to reduce the noise by controlling the environment.

Internal electronic noise of measurement systems can be reduced through the use of low-noise amplifiers.

When the characteristics of the noise are known and are different from the signal, it is possible to use a filter to reduce the noise. For example, a lock-in amplifier can extract a narrow-bandwidth signal from broadband noise a million times stronger.

When the signal is constant or periodic, and the noise is random, it is possible to enhance the SNR by averaging the measurements. In this case the noise goes down as the square root of the number of averaged samples.

== Digital signals ==
When a measurement is digitized, the number of bits used to represent the measurement determines the maximum possible signal-to-noise ratio. This is because the minimum possible noise level is the error caused by the quantization of the signal, sometimes called quantization noise. This noise level is non-linear and signal-dependent; different calculations exist for different signal models. Quantization noise is modeled as an analog error signal summed with the signal before quantization ("additive noise").

This theoretical maximum SNR assumes a perfect input signal. If the input signal is already noisy (as is usually the case), the signal's noise may be larger than the quantization noise. Real analog-to-digital converters also have other sources of noise that further decrease the SNR compared to the theoretical maximum from the idealized quantization noise, including the intentional addition of dither.

Although noise levels in a digital system can be expressed using SNR, it is more common to use E_{b}/N_{o}, the energy per bit per noise power spectral density.

The modulation error ratio (MER) is a measure of the SNR in a digitally modulated signal.

=== Fixed point ===
For n-bit integers with equal distance between quantization levels (uniform quantization), the dynamic range (DR) is also determined.

Assuming a uniform distribution of input signal values, the quantization noise is a uniformly distributed random signal with a peak-to-peak amplitude of one quantization level, making the amplitude ratio 2^{n}/1. The formula is then:

$$\mathrm{DR_{dB}} = \mathrm{SNR_{dB}} = 20 \log_{10}(2^n) \approx 6.02 \cdot n$$

This relationship is the origin of statements like "16-bit audio has a dynamic range of 96 dB". Each extra quantization bit increases the dynamic range by roughly 6 dB.

Assuming a full-scale sine wave signal (that is, the quantizer is designed such that it has the same minimum and maximum values as the input signal), the quantization noise approximates a sawtooth wave with peak-to-peak amplitude of one quantization level and uniform distribution. In this case, the SNR is approximately

$$\mathrm{SNR_{dB}} \approx 20 \log_{10} (2^n {\textstyle\sqrt {3/2}}) \approx 6.02 \cdot n + 1.761$$

=== Floating point ===
Floating-point numbers provide a way to trade off signal-to-noise ratio for an increase in dynamic range. For n-bit floating-point numbers, with n-m bits in the mantissa and m bits in the exponent:

$$\mathrm{DR_{dB}} = 6.02 \cdot 2^m$$

$$\mathrm{SNR_{dB}} = 6.02 \cdot (n-m)$$

The dynamic range is much larger than fixed-point, but at a cost of a worse signal-to-noise ratio. This makes floating-point preferable in situations where the dynamic range is large or unpredictable. Fixed-point's simpler implementations can be used with no signal quality disadvantage in systems where the dynamic range is less than 6.02 × m. The very large dynamic range of floating-point can be a disadvantage, since it requires more forethought in designing algorithms. (Note: Often special filters are used to weight the noise: DIN-A, DIN-B, DIN-C, DIN-D, CCIR-601; for video, special filters such as comb filters may be used.) (Note: Maximum possible full scale signal can be charged as peak-to-peak or as RMS. Audio uses RMS, Video P-P, which gave +9 dB more SNR for video.)

== Optical signals ==
Optical signals have a carrier frequency (about 200 THz and more) that is much higher than the modulation frequency. This way, the noise covers a bandwidth that is much wider than the signal itself. The resulting signal influence relies mainly on the filtering of the noise. To describe the signal quality without taking the receiver into account, optical signal-to-noise ratio (OSNR) is used. OSNR is the ratio between the signal power and the noise power in a given bandwidth. Most commonly, a reference bandwidth of 0.1 nm is used. This bandwidth is independent of the modulation format, the frequency and the receiver. For instance, an OSNR of 20 dB/0.1 nm could be given, even though the signal of 40-GBit DPSK would not fit in this bandwidth. OSNR is measured with an optical spectrum analyzer.

== Types and abbreviations ==
Signal to noise ratio may be abbreviated as SNR and less commonly as S/N. PSNR stands for peak signal-to-noise ratio. GSNR stands for geometric signal-to-noise ratio. SINR is the signal-to-interference-plus-noise ratio.

== Other uses ==
While SNR is commonly quoted for electrical signals, it can be applied to any form of signal, for example, isotope levels in an ice core, biochemical signaling between cells, or financial trading signals.

The term is sometimes used metaphorically to refer to the ratio of useful information to false or irrelevant data in a conversation or exchange. For example, in online discussion forums and other online communities, off-topic posts and spam are regarded as noise that interferes with the signal of appropriate discussion.

SNR can also be applied in marketing and how business professionals manage information overload. Managing a healthy signal-to-noise ratio can help business executives improve their KPIs (Key Performance Indicators).

== Similar concepts ==
The signal-to-noise ratio is similar to Cohen's d given by the difference of estimated means divided by the standard deviation of the data $d=\frac{\bar{X}_1 - \bar{X}_2}{\text{SD}}=\frac{\bar{X}_1 - \bar{X}_2}{\sigma}=\frac {t} {\sqrt N}$ and is related to the test statistic $t$ in the t-test.

== See also ==
- Audio system measurements
- Generation loss
- Matched filter
- Near–far problem
- Noise margin
- Omega ratio
- Pareidolia
- Peak signal-to-noise ratio
- Signal-to-noise statistic
- Signal-to-interference-plus-noise ratio
- SINAD
- SINADR
- Subjective video quality
- Total harmonic distortion
- Video quality
