= DBm =

Power level referenced to one milliwatt

A schematic showing the relationship between dBu (the voltage source) and dBm (the power dissipated as heat by the 600 Ω resistor)

dBm or dB_{mW} (decibel-milliwatts) is a unit of power level expressed using a logarithmic decibel (dB) scale respective to one milliwatt (mW). It is commonly used by radio, microwave and fiber-optical communication technicians & engineers to measure the power of system transmissions on a log scale, which can express both very large and very small values in a short form. dBW is a similar unit measured relative to one watt (1000 mW) rather than a milliwatt.

The decibel (dB) is a dimensionless unit, used for quantifying the ratio between two values, such as signal-to-noise ratio. The dBm is also dimensionless, but since it compares to a fixed reference value, the dBm quantity is an absolute one.

The dBm is not a part of the International System of Units (SI) and therefore is discouraged from use in documents or systems that adhere to SI units. (The corresponding SI unit is the watt.) The level of a power P of ten decibels relative to one milliwatt may be written L_{P/(1 mW)} = 10 dB to comply with the SI.

In audio and telephony, dBm is typically referenced relative to the 600-ohm impedance commonly used in telephone voice networks, while in radio-frequency work dBm is typically referenced relative to a 50-ohm impedance.

== Unit conversions ==
A power level of 0 dBm corresponds to a power of 1 milliwatt. An increase in level of 10 dB is equivalent to a ten-fold increase in power. Therefore, a 20 dB increase in level is equivalent to a 100-fold increase in power. A 3 dB increase in level is approximately equivalent to doubling the power, which means that a level of 3 dBm corresponds roughly to a power of 2 mW. Similarly, for each 3 dB decrease in level, the power is reduced by about one half, making −3 dBm correspond to a power of about 0.5 mW.

To express an arbitrary power P in mW as x in dBm, the following expression may be used:
$$\begin{align}
x &= 10 \log_{10} \frac{P}{1~\text{mW}}
\end{align}$$
Conversely, to express an arbitrary power level x in dBm, as P in mW:
$$\begin{align}
P &= 1~\text{mW} \cdot 10^{{x}/{10}}
\end{align}$$

== Table of examples ==
Below is a table summarizing useful cases:

Power level	Power	Notes
526 dBm	3.6×10^{49} W	Black hole collision, the power radiated in gravitational waves following the collision GW150914, estimated at 50 times the power output of all the stars in the observable universe
420 dBm	1×10^{39} W	Cygnus A, one of the most powerful radio sources in the sky
296 dBm	3.846×10^{26} W	Total power output of the Sun
120 dBm	1 GW	Experimental high-power microwave (HPM) generation system, 1 GW at 2.32 GHz for 38 ns
105 dBm	32 MW	AN/FPS-85 Phased Array Space Surveillance Radar, claimed by the US Space Force as the most powerful radar in the world
95.5 dBm	3600 kW	High-frequency Active Auroral Research Program maximum power output, the most powerful shortwave station in 2012
80 dBm	100 kW	Typical transmission power of FM radio station with 50-kilometre (31 mi) range
62 dBm	1.588 kW	1.5 kW is the maximum legal power output of a US ham radio station.
60 dBm	1 kW	Typical combined radiated RF power of microwave oven elements
55 dBm	~300 W	Typical single-channel RF output power of a K_{u} band geostationary satellite
50 dBm	100 W	Typical total thermal radiation emitted by a human body, peak at 31.5 THz (9.5 μm); Typical maximum output RF power from a ham radio HF transceiver without power amplifier
40 dBm	10 W	Typical power-line communication (PLC) transmission power
37 dBm	5 W	Typical maximal output RF power from a handheld ham radio VHF/UHF transceiver
36 dBm	4 W	Typical maximal output power for a citizens band radio station (27 MHz) in many countries
33 dBm	2 W	Maximal output from a UMTS/3G mobile phone (power class 1 mobiles); Maximal output from a GSM850/900 mobile phone
30 dBm	1 W	DCS or GSM 1800/1900 MHz mobile phone. EIRP IEEE 802.11a (20 MHz-wide channels) in either 5 GHz subband 2 (5470–5725 MHz) provided that transmitters are also IEEE 802.11h-compliant, or U-NII-3 (5725–5825 MHz). The former is EU only, the latter is US only. Also, maximal power allowed by the FCC for American amateur radio licensees to fly radio-controlled aircraft or operate RC models of any other type on the amateur radio bands in the US.
27 dBm	500 mW	Typical cellular phone transmission power Maximal output from a UMTS/3G mobile phone (power class 2 mobiles)
24 dBm	251 mW	Maximal output from a UMTS/3G mobile phone (power class 3 mobiles); 1880–1900 MHz DECT (250 mW per 1728 kHz channel). EIRP for wireless LAN IEEE 802.11a (20 MHz-wide channels) in either the 5 GHz subband 1 (5180–5320 MHz) or U-NII-2 and -W ranges (5250–5350 MHz & 5470–5725 MHz, respectively). The former is EU only, the latter is US only.
23 dBm	200 mW	EIRP for IEEE 802.11n wireless LAN 40 MHz-wide (5 mW/MHz) channels in 5 GHz subband 4 (5735–5835 MHz, US only) or 5 GHz subband 2 (5470–5725 MHz, EU only). Also applies to 20 MHz-wide (10 mW/MHz) IEEE 802.11a wireless LAN in 5 GHz subband 1 (5180–5320 MHz) if also IEEE 802.11h-compliant (otherwise only 3 mW/MHz → 60 mW when unable to dynamically adjust transmission power, and only 1.5 mW/MHz → 30 mW when a transmitter also cannot dynamically select frequency)
21 dBm	125 mW	Maximal output from a UMTS/3G mobile phone (power class 4 mobiles)
20 dBm	100 mW	EIRP for IEEE 802.11b/g wireless LAN 20 MHz-wide channels in the 2.4 GHz Wi-Fi/ISM band (5 mW/MHz). Bluetooth Class 1 radio. Maximal output power from unlicensed AM transmitter per US FCC rules 15.219
15 dBm	32 mW	Typical wireless LAN transmission power in laptops
7 dBm	5.0 mW	Common power level required to test the automatic gain control circuitry in an AM receiver
4 dBm	2.5 mW	Bluetooth Class 2 radio, 10 m-range
0 dBm	1.0 mW	Bluetooth standard (Class 3) radio, 1 m-range
−10 dBm	100 μW	Maximal received signal power of wireless network (802.11 variants)
−13 dBm	50 μW	Dial tone for the precise tone plan found on public switched telephone networks in North America
−20 dBm	10 μW	
−30 dBm	1.0 μW	
−40 dBm	100 nW	
−50 dBm	10 nW	
−60 dBm	1.0 nW	The Earth receives one nanowatt per square metre from a star of apparent magnitude +3.5
−70 dBm	100 pW	
−73 dBm	50.12 pW	"S9" signal strength, a strong signal, on the S meter of a typical ham or shortwave radio receiver
−80 dBm	10 pW	
−100 dBm	0.1 pW	Minimal received signal power of wireless network (802.11 variants)
−111 dBm	8 fW	Thermal noise floor for commercial GPS single-channel signal bandwidth (2 MHz)
−127.5 dBm	0.178 fW	Typical received signal power from a GPS satellite
−159 dBm	0.128 aW	Power corresponding to a single 1550-nm wavelength photon per second, typical of the dark count of the best photodetectors (superconducting nanowire single-photon detectors, transition-edge sensors).
−174 dBm	4 zW	Thermal noise floor for 1 Hz bandwidth at room temperature (20 °C)
−192.5 dBm	56 yW	Thermal noise floor for 1 Hz bandwidth in outer space (4 K)
−∞ dBm	0 W	Zero power (value is negative infinity)

== Standards ==
The signal intensity (power per unit area) can be converted to received signal power by multiplying by the square of the wavelength and dividing by 4π (see Free-space path loss).

In United States Department of Defense practice, unweighted measurement is normally understood, applicable to a certain bandwidth, which must be stated or implied.

In European practice, psophometric weighting may be, as indicated by context, equivalent to dBm0p, which is preferred.

In audio, 0 dBm often corresponds to approximately 0.775 volts, since 0.775 V dissipates 1 mW in a 600 Ω load. The corresponding voltage level is 0 dBu, without the 600 Ω restriction. Conversely, for RF situations with a 50 Ω load, 0 dBm corresponds to approximately 0.224 volts, since 0.224 V dissipates 1 mW in a 50 Ω load.

In general the relationship between the level of a power P in dBm and the RMS voltage V in volts across a load of resistance R (typically used to terminate a transmission line with impedance Z) is:
$$\begin{align}
V &= \sqrt{R \frac{10^{P/10}}{1000}}\,.
\end{align}$$

Expression in dBm is typically used for optical and electrical power measurements, not for other types of power (such as thermal). A listing by power levels in watts is available that includes a variety of examples not necessarily related to electrical or optical power.

The dBm was first proposed as an industry standard in 1940.

== See also ==
- Decibel watt
- dBm0
