= Full scale =

Maximum amplitude a system can represent

In electronics and signal processing, full scale represents the maximum amplitude a system can represent.

In digital systems, a signal is said to be at digital full scale when its magnitude has reached the maximum representable value. Once a signal has reached digital full scale, all headroom has been utilized, and any further increase in amplitude will result in an error known as clipping. The amplitude of a digital signal can be represented in percent; full scale; or decibels, full scale (dBFS).

In analog systems, full scale may be defined by the maximum voltage available, or the maximum deflection (full scale deflection or FSD) or indication of an analog instrument such as a moving coil meter or galvanometer.

== Binary representation ==
Since binary integer representation range is asymmetrical, full scale is defined using the maximum positive value that can be represented. For example, 16-bit PCM audio is centered on the value 0, and can contain values from −32,768 to +32,767. A signal is at full-scale if it reaches from −32,767 to +32,767. (This means that −32,768, the lowest possible value, slightly exceeds full-scale.)

Signal processing in digital audio workstations often uses floating-point arithmetic, which can include values past full-scale, to avoid clipping in intermediate processing stages. In a floating-point representation, a full-scale signal is typically defined to reach from −1.0 to +1.0.

== Processing ==
The signal passes through an anti-aliasing, resampling, or reconstruction filter, which may increase peak amplitude slightly due to ringing.

It is possible for the analog signal represented by the digital data to exceed digital full scale even if the digital data does not, and vice versa. Converting to the analog domain, there is no clipping problem as long as the analog circuitry in the digital-to-analog converter is well designed.

If a full-scale analog signal is converted to digital with sufficient sampling frequency, and then reconstructed, the Nyquist theorem guarantees that there will be no problem in the analog domain due to "peak" issues because the restored analog signal will be an exact copy of the original analog signal. (However, if the signal is normalized in the digital domain, it may contain "intersample peaks" which exceed full scale after analog reconstruction.)
