= Dan Dugan (audio engineer) =

American audio engineer (born 1943)

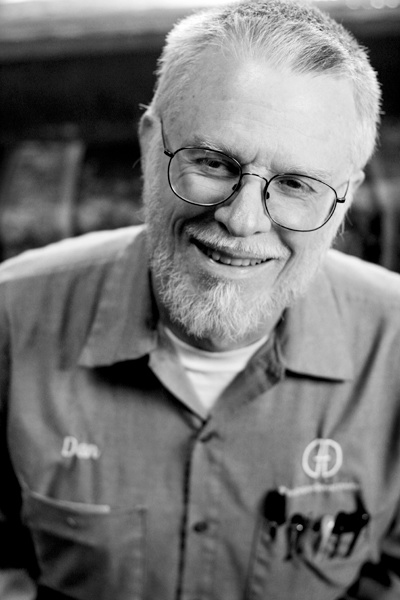
- Born: March 20, 1943 (age 83); Los Angeles, California, US
- Other name: Daniel W. Dugan
- Occupations: Audio engineer; inventor; sound designer; nature recordist
- Website: http://www.dandugan.com/

Dan Dugan (born March 20, 1943) is an American audio engineer, inventor, and nature sounds recordist. He was the first person in regional theatre to be called a sound designer, and he developed the first effective automatic microphone mixer: the automixer. Dugan's sound design work was acknowledged in 2003 with a Distinguished Career Award by the United States Institute for Theatre Technology, and in 2020 with an Emmy Award for technology relevant to remote working. In 2021 he was awarded Fellowship in the Audio Engineering Society.

In his youth, Dugan was fascinated by the technical aspects of theatre. He worked as a lighting designer then transitioned to sound design in 1967. Dugan became interested in achieving the automatic adjustment of sound controls after a frustrating experience staging the musical Hair. His first automixer design was not fully practical but his second design was successful; it used a reference derived from a total of all of its microphone signals. Dugan devised a third improvement which helped prevent audio feedback in the presence of sound reinforcement loudspeakers. Dugan next produced an automixer design that could be inserted into an existing mixing console. This proved popular for broadcast and live sound applications. Each of Dugan's subsequent automixer models has been of the insertable type.

Dugan first recorded sounds in the late 1960s to augment his sound designs. He continued making recordings, concentrating on capturing the sounds of nature. Dugan records outdoors in a variety of locations including national parks and nature preserves. He has assisted in research related to the harmful effects of human-generated sound in nature. Dugan is a co-founder and current secretary of People for Legal and Nonsectarian Schools (PLANS), a California non-profit organization incorporated in 1997.

== Early career ==
Daniel W. Dugan was born in Los Angeles, California, on March 20, 1943, after his father, U.S. Navy Commander P. F. Dugan, had been activated for service in the Pacific War. "Dan" Dugan was raised in San Diego where his parents took him to the Old Globe Theatre and summer musicals at the Ford Bowl—he always wanted to go backstage to see the lighting control equipment. As a young man he sang bass in the church choir, in the San Diego Bach Chorus, in choral workshops under Roger Wagner at San Diego State University, and in madrigal groups for "Dancing on the Green", an Elizabethan-era folk dancing event held in front of the Old Globe. Dugan obtained a four-year scholarship to the University of San Francisco and majored in physics and math. He dropped out in 1963 to pursue stagecraft, specifically lighting design. His early lighting designs include ones for the San Diego National Shakespeare Festival at the Old Globe Theatre, the San Diego Opera, and the Actor's Workshop in San Francisco.

== Sound design ==
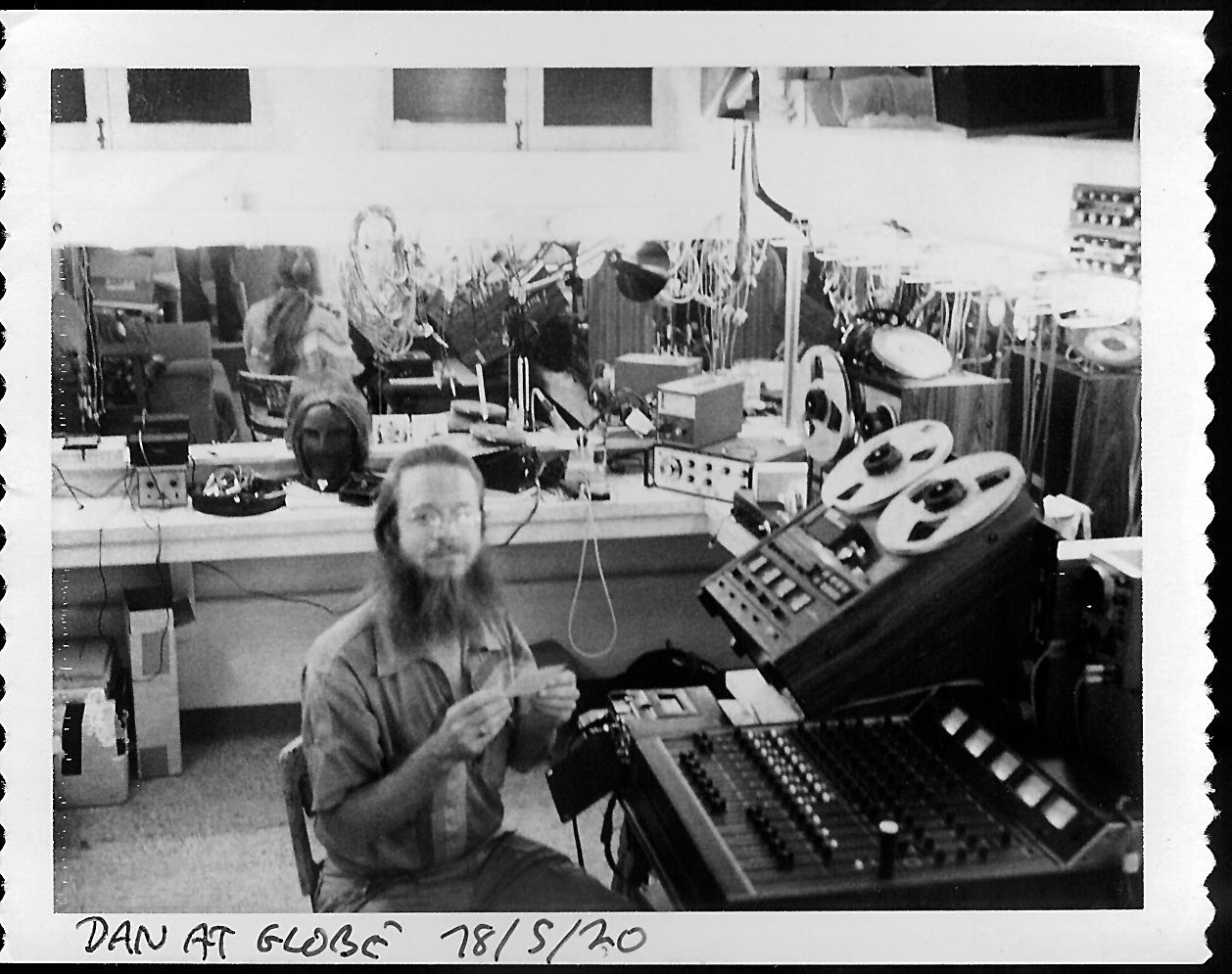
1978: Dugan prepares sound design materials in a dressing room at the Old Globe Theatre in San Diego

Dugan changed from lighting design to sound design in 1967. The state of sound design at the time was mostly occasional sound effects performed live or played back on record players or tape machines. Dugan's first efforts in sound involved designing sound solutions for the Shakespeare festival in San Diego and for the American Conservatory Theater (ACT) in San Francisco. Dugan's complex and atmospheric theatrical soundscapes led to a new title: during ACT's 1968–69 season, he was the first regional theatre person to be called a "sound designer". He presented a paper about his sound design to the Audio Engineering Society (AES) at their 37th convention, and his paper was published in the Journal of the Audio Engineering Society in December 1969. Dugan described a system in which the signals from three stereo tape players were routed to ten loudspeaker zones in the theater.

Dugan designed sound for three regional productions of Hair, the musical: ones in Chicago, Las Vegas and Toronto. The Chicago production ran in 1969 and 1970 at the Blackstone Theatre, operated at that time by The Shubert Organization. Dugan was able to design sound but not allowed to operate the mixing console because he was not in the stagehands union: International Alliance of Theatrical Stage Employees (IATSE).

When Margrit Mondavi founded the Mondavi Summer Music Festival in 1969 at the Robert Mondavi Winery, primarily featuring jazz artists, Dugan supplied sound services at the outdoor venue in Napa, California. He recorded independent record albums, including Kate Wolf's first two: Back Roads (1976) and Lines on the Paper (1977) and designed sound for the Sacramento Music Circus.

Dugan occasionally delivered speeches at conferences of the United States Institute for Theatre Technology (USITT) in the 1980s and 1990s. In 2003 the USITT honored Dugan with the Harold Burris-Meyer Distinguished Career in Sound Design Award, given for "a lifetime spent establishing the field of sound design for the performing arts, as both artist and innovator in audio engineering and technology." Previous winners of the award were Abe Jacob, John Bracewell and Tony Meola.

== Automixer ==
While designing sound for the musical Hair, Dugan began to appreciate the human operator's inability to act quickly enough to control multiple microphones. He saw the show's audio mixing person "working rotary knobs for 16 area mics, 9 hand mics, and 10 mics in the band". Dugan thought that a microphone should not be turned on unless it was getting some worthwhile signal, more than just the room ambiance. His frustration with microphone mixing led him to experiment for a few years with microphone signals controlled automatically by voltage-controlled amplifiers (VCAs), finally developing the "Dugan Music System", shown to the AES at their 49th convention, held in New York in 1974. This system used a novel proportional gain algorithm whereby the total gain was divided between all active microphones. The microphones were "continuously and automatically adjusted" by a set of VCAs to bring each microphone up or down in the mix, based on how much signal it was sending relative to the signal received by a reference microphone placed somewhat distant from the other microphones. Dugan's patent application for a "Control Apparatus for Sound Reinforcement Systems" was accepted and published on June 4, 1974. This was the first useful automatic microphone mixing algorithm, the basis for all of Dugan's later systems.

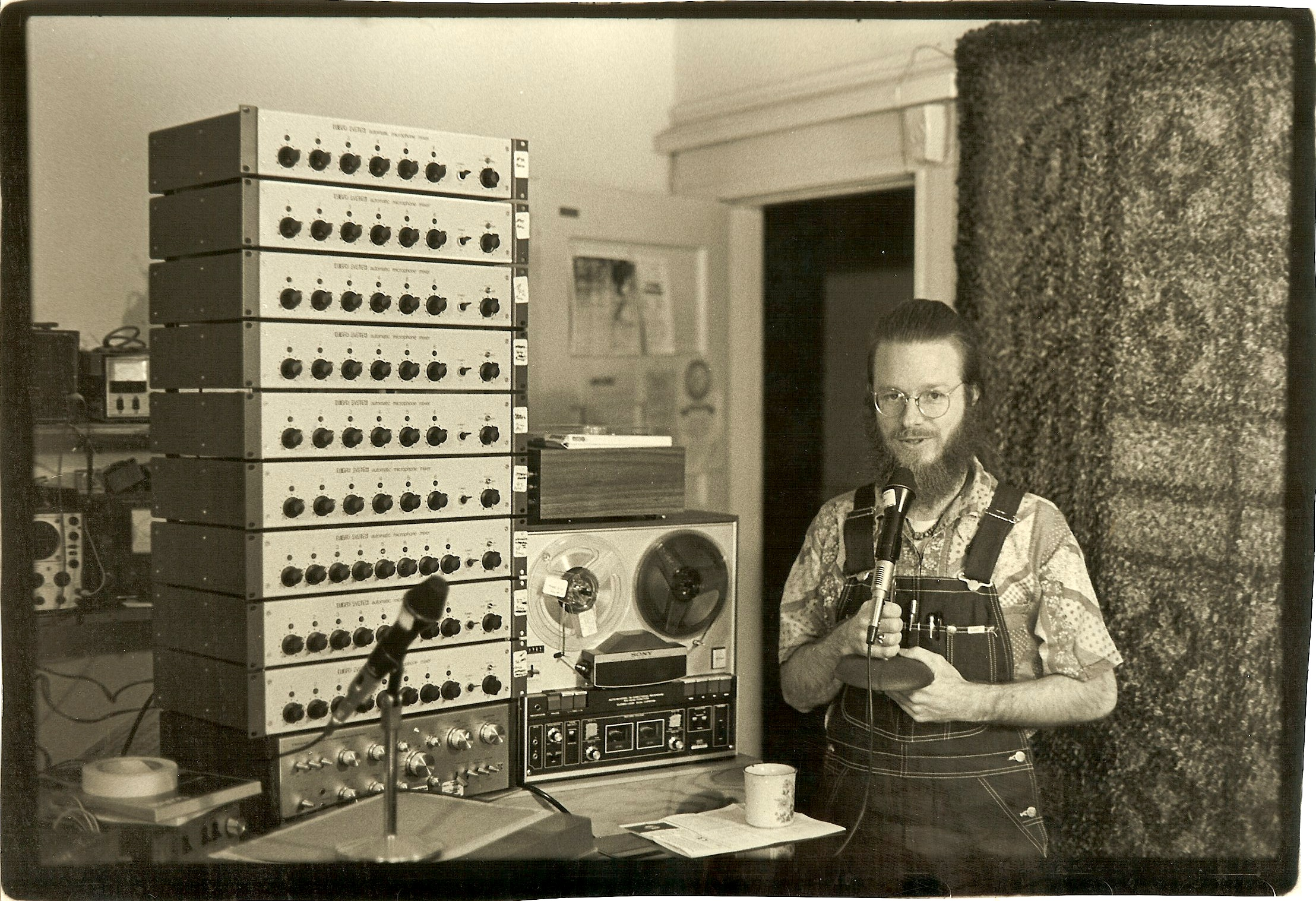
Dugan tests nine Model A automixers, ca. 1980

Though the algorithm was good, the reference microphone was an unpredictable variable: it had practical placement problems. If it was near the audience, audience noise would skew the algorithm. If placed backstage, crew and equipment noises could be a factor. Thus, the Dugan Music System was not immediately developed into a product. Dugan studied the problem, researching alternative solutions. In 1975, Dugan filed a patent for the "Dugan Speech System", and in 1976 produced 60 copies of what he named the Dugan Model A. The automixer with serial number 1, a unit Dugan fabricated by hand, "was installed in the conference room of Bell Labs by Harvey Fletcher". Significantly, the external microphone reference of the Dugan Music System was replaced by a reference composed of the total signal received from all of the active microphones. Dugan described the process some three decades later:

"I was messing around with logarithmic level detection, seeing what would happen if I used the sum of all the inputs as a reference. That's when I accidentally came upon the system. It was really discovered, not invented. I didn't really know what I had, just that it worked like gangbusters."

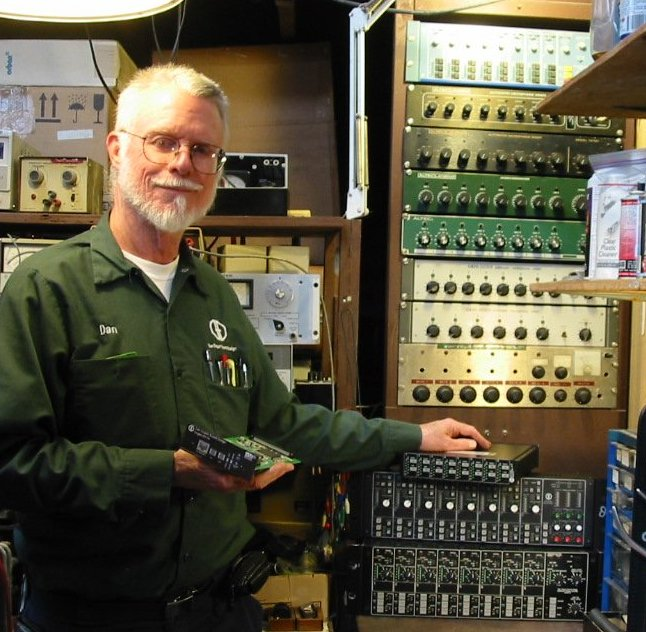
Dugan holds his Yamaha Dugan-MY16 card (2011), and to his left are earlier automixer models

Dugan licensed this more practical system to Altec who produced 4- and 8-channel automixers for commercial installations such as hotels, conference rooms, courtrooms and city council chambers. The Dugan Speech System was the first commercially successful automixing algorithm. Over the next 15 years, other manufacturers designed competing automixers, and the market segment was born.

In the late 1980s, Dugan developed a gain limiting improvement to the automixing algorithm. The Dugan Gain Limiting System was patented in September 1989 and presented to the 87th AES convention in October. Dugan described for the AES his prototype of an automixer to be inserted into selected microphone channels of a mixing console, operated by a person, to help in mixing multiple live microphones to have less reverberation and noise, more focus on the desired sound, eliminating the mixing engineer's problem of too-slow human reaction time. The gain limiting system provided smooth, continuous control over the equivalent number of open microphones (NOM) that the automixer would send at its outputs. The NOM could be set anywhere between 1 and 10, with higher settings sounding more natural for a recording in a studio, and lower settings offering greater control of acoustic feedback in the presence of sound reinforcement loudspeakers. An embodiment of Dugan's three patents was produced as the Model D Automatic Mixing Controller, a 3U rack unit handling 8 channels which could be linked with up to 11 other Model Ds to automatically mix as many as 96 channels simultaneously.

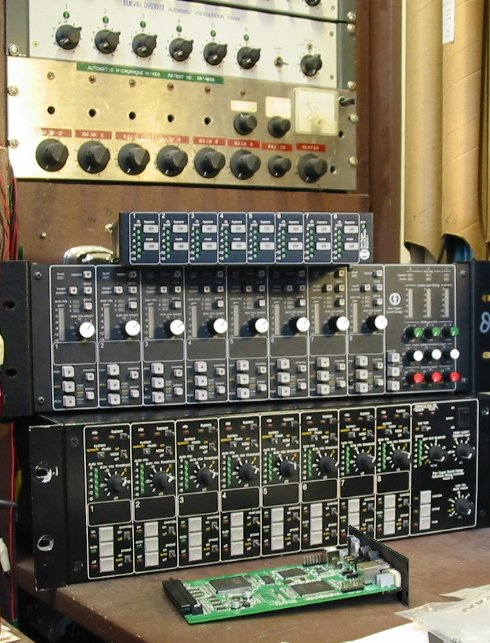
Generations of Dugan's automixers

Dugan's original 1974 patent expired in 1991, and the Dugan Speech System patent in 1993. Other manufacturers began to sell automixers incorporating the Dugan algorithm. In 1996, Dugan produced the Model D-1, an automixer for speech-only applications. The Model D-2 returned to having applicability for both speech and music, as did the Model D-3. In 1997, Dugan licensed his system to Protech Audio of Indian Lake, New York, yielding the Protech 2000 model series.

In September 2006, Dugan produced the Model E, the E standing for economy. This half-rack-sized automixer was much smaller and less expensive than previous ones. It could be linked with another Model E to control up to 16 channels; two units could be mounted side-by-side in only 1U of rack space. The Model E's popularity came with many critical requests for features, and in May 2008 the Model E-1 was introduced; an incremental improvement to replace the Model E. It allowed ADAT Lightpipe interconnections between linked units and a digital mixing console, helpful with Yamaha, Mackie and other digital audio gear containing ADAT inputs and outputs. Its user interface was a simple web browser page, accessible by computer connected with Category 5 cable.

In February 2011, Dugan demonstrated an automixer card, marketed by Yamaha, to plug into the accessory slot of a Yamaha digital mixer such as the O1V96, LS9, M7CL or PM5D. This card, the Dugan-MY16, could mix up to 16 channels of microphone inputs, assigned to selected inserts in the mixer's graphic user interface. Like the Model E-1, the automixer could be adjusted through a web browser interface, allowing remote control with an iPad, touchscreen computer or laptop over wireless network. The Dugan algorithm moved inside Yamaha's QL-series of mixers in March 2014, as an option on the graphic equalizer processing page. This internal version could mix 8 or 16 microphones.

== Nature sounds ==
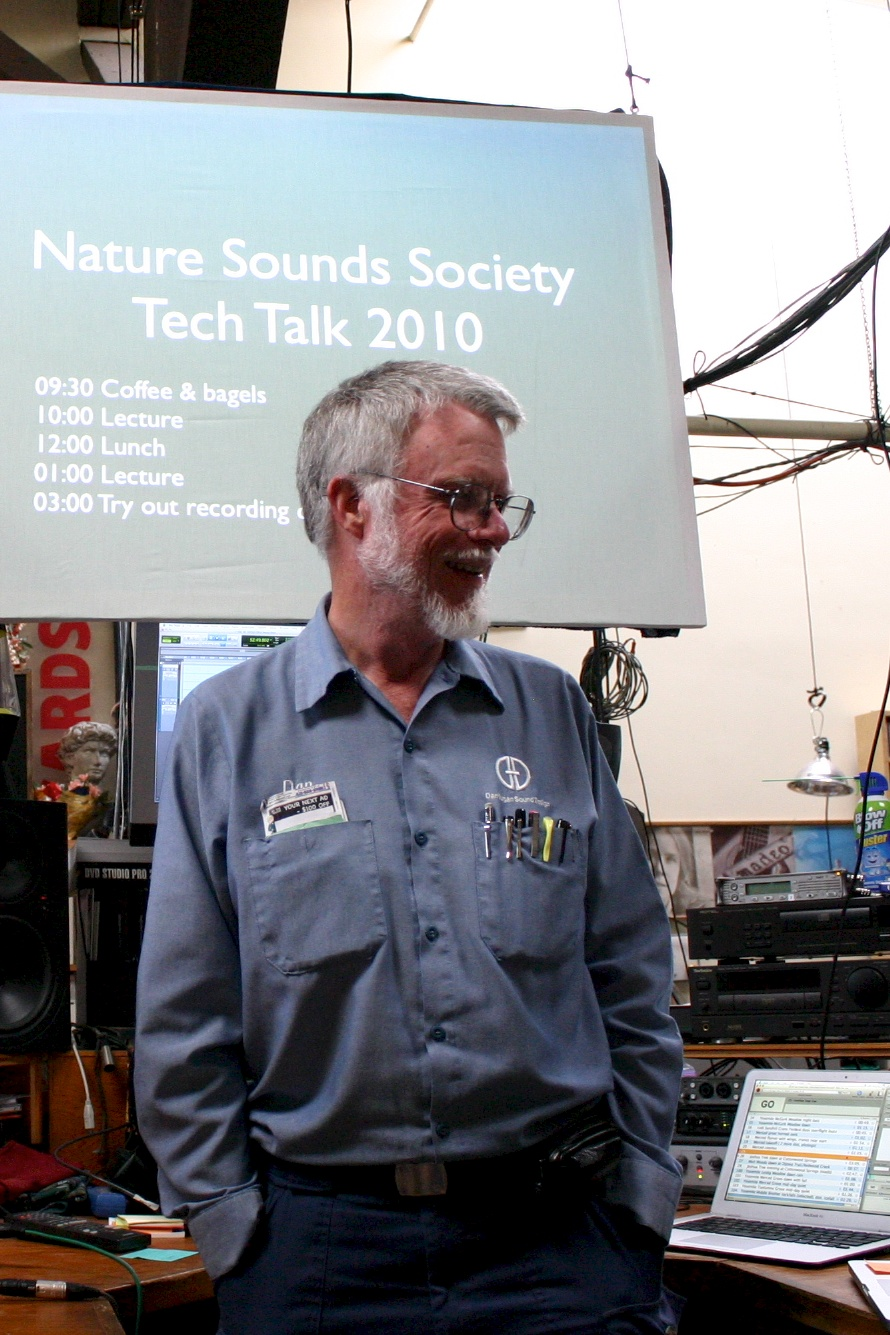
Hosting a "Tech Talk" for nature sounds recordists

Dugan made his first sound effects recordings to augment his theatrical sound designs. As he grew more interested in field recording, he was attracted to the sounds found in pristine natural settings—environments without human noise. A board member and webmaster of Nature Sounds Society, Dugan has conducted equipment training sessions since 1994, and has given talks about his experiences in nature recording. He has traveled to New Zealand in pursuit of recordings, but mainly devotes himself to U.S. National Parks and Monuments such as Yosemite and Muir Woods. Other national parks and monuments at which he has recorded sound include Joshua Tree, Pinnacles, Lassen Volcanic, Yellowstone, Haleakala, Olympic, Zion, Bryce Canyon, Kings Canyon, Sequoia and Lava Beds.

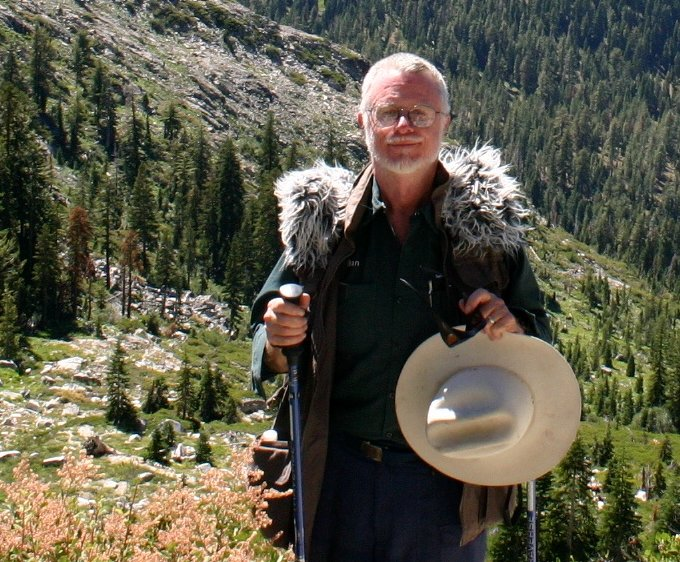
Recording in the field wearing a vest with attached microphones protected by furry windscreens

Dugan and his wife Sharon Perry, the Nature Sounds Society chair, recorded the dawn chorus of Cathedral Grove in Muir Woods once each month for a year. He has partnered with the National Park Service and the California Library of Natural Sounds to document the various sounds heard in U.S. parks. Regarding his reasons for doing so, Dugan wrote in 2008:

"There are three potential values in soundscape recording in a National Park. Scientific, to document the biophony at that place and time. Political, to document the anthrophony, collecting evidence that might be useful in policy-making about aircraft and visitor traffic. Artistic, to use in natural sound compositions."

In 2006, Dugan assisted a group of researchers studying soundscapes and human use at Muir Woods. The researchers presented their findings at the Northeastern Recreation Research Symposium, produced by the United States Forest Service, a work titled, "From Landscapes to Soundscapes: Understanding and Managing Natural Quiet in the National Parks". They concluded that human-generated noise "is a potentially important indicator of quality" of soundscapes in parks.

== PLANS, Inc. ==
In 1998 an organization he co-founded, People for Legal and Nonsectarian Schools (PLANS), filed a federal lawsuit against Sacramento City Unified School District and Twin Ridges Elementary School District in California arguing that their Waldorf-methods-inspired schools violated the First and Fourteenth Amendments of the United States Constitution and Article IX of the California Constitution. Dugan participated in the court proceedings. After years of litigation, the 9th circuit court dismissed the case on its merits in 2012.

As co-founder and Secretary of PLANS, Dugan has given media interviews and was quoted in the book The Flickering Mind: The False Promise of Technology in the Classroom and How Learning Can Be Saved. He said Waldorf schools are "faith-based" and draw from an educational theory that is "frozen" in 1925.
