= Helix Board 12 FireWire =

Mixing console

The Helix Board 12 FireWire is a mixer developed by Phonic Corporation that features a FireWire Interface, able to connect the mixer to Windows and Mac computers. The product was released in 2005 and has since become a signature product for the company

== Outputs ==
The Helix Board 12 FireWire has a stereo main output, control room output, auxiliary send, headphones outputs, RCA record outputs and alternate 3-4 outputs.

== Digital Effects ==
A built-in 16 program, 32-bit effect processor is included with the Helix Board 12 FireWire. Effects include Hall, Room, Plate, Cathedral, and more.

== FireWire Interface ==
The FireWire interface allows all 8 inputs (counting stereo channels as 2) of the Helix Board 12 FireWire to be sent to a computer for recording, through its ASIO drivers (no drivers are required for the Mac). The main stereo output of your computer can also be sent through the FireWire interface, back to the Helix Board. The returned signal can be routed by the touch of one of the buttons on the face of the mixer.

The Helix Board 12 FireWire is bundled with Steinberg Cubase LE software for recording purposes, though it's suggested that users upgrade to SX or use other digital audio workstation software.

== System requirements ==
=== Windows ===
- Microsoft Windows XP SP1 or SP2
- Available FireWire port
- Intel Pentium 4 processor or equivalent AMD processor
- Motherboard with Intel or VIA chipset
- 5400RPM or faster hard disc drive (7200 RPM or faster with 8MB cache recommended)
- 256MB or more of RAM (512MB recommended)

=== Macintosh ===
- Mac OS X 10.3.5 or later with native FireWire support
- G4 or newer processor
- 256MB or more of RAM

== MKII ==
2006 saw the release of the Helix Board 12 FireWire MKII, which included additional features. Among these was a new DFX processor, pre/post switch on each input channel and a channel 9/10 assign switch.
