= Phonic =

Phonic may refer to:

- A synonym of phonetic, pertaining to sounds or speech
- Phonic Corporation, a Taiwan-based audio equipment manufacturer
- Phonic FM, a community radio station in Exeter, Devon, England

== See also ==
- Phonics, a method for teaching reading
