= Automixer =

Live sound mixing device

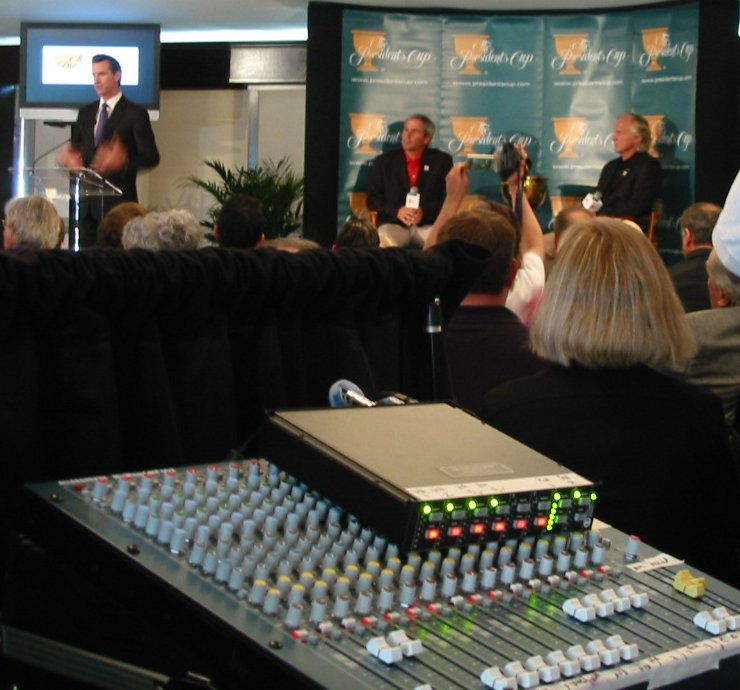
Microphones at a press conference being processed through a Dugan E-1 automixer which has been placed on top of the regular audio mixer. San Francisco mayor Gavin Newsom is speaking at a lectern, while golfers Fred Couples and Greg Norman are seated on stage. Six of eight automixer inputs have been muted and are showing red LEDs. The active input is showing full gain with a ladder of green LEDs.

An automixer, or automatic microphone mixer, is a live sound mixing device that automatically reduces the strength of a microphone's audio signal when it is not being used.

Automixers reduce extraneous noise picked up and comb filtering effects when several microphones operate simultaneously. Automixers uses a variety of methods that allow increased gain before feedback for live sound reinforcement.

Automixers are typically used to mix panel discussions on television talk shows and at conferences and seminars. They can also be used to mix actors' wireless microphones in theater productions and musicals. Automixers are frequently employed in settings where it is expected that a live sound operator won't be present, such as courtrooms and city council chambers.

== Use ==
Automixers balance multiple sound sources based on each source's level, quickly and dramatically adjusting the various signal levels automatically. Automixers are used in live sound reinforcement to maintain a steady limit on the overall signal level of the microphones; if a public address system is set up so that one microphone will not feed back, then, in general, the automixer will prevent feedback when multiple microphones are used. The equivalent number of open mics (NOM) present at the output of the automixer is kept low, regardless of the actual number of mics in use.

While a skilled mixing engineer can greatly enhance the performance of a sound reinforcement system they cannot anticipate with perfect accuracy which participant will speak next in a spontaneous discussion. Sudden interjections by panelists may be lost completely, or the beginning of a word may be absent (or upcut) because the operator does not respond quickly enough. A properly adjusted automixer can prevent losing words or phrases due to upcut mistakes or lapses of attention.

Priority ducking is used to lower the level of a microphone or program material, based on a signal at a source microphone, for the duration of the signal present at the source microphone. It restores the original level once the source microphone signal has ceased. This is useful when program material needs to be attenuated in order to accentuate the voice of a narrator or if one microphone is used by a chairman or master of ceremonies and needs to have priority over other mics or program material, or if a paging mic must attenuate all other signals.

Automixers can be oriented toward live reinforcement applications or permanent installation. Automixers are frequently used in boardrooms but are also useful in theatrical productions and town hall meetings at which several wireless microphones are in use. Historically, automixers could be connected directly to wired mics and wireless mic receivers or connected to the insert of a mixing console. Integration of an automixer with a mixing console permits more precise input gain control, absolute mic muting, low cut filter and other equalization and individual mic channel foldback control. Starting in 2004, automixers began to be incorporated into certain mixing console models, with limitations on which channels could be automixed and how many channels. In 2017, Waves Audio pushed past this limitation by offering Dugan automixing as a plugin. Some modern mixers have internal Dugan-style gain-sharing automixing available for every input channel.

== History ==
Frank J. Clement and Bell Labs received a patent in 1969 for a multiple-station conference telephone system that switched its output to the loudest input. The next year, Emil Torick and Richard G. Allen were granted a patent for an "Automatic Gain Control System with Noise Variable Threshold", an adaptive threshold circuit invention with its patent assignation going to Columbia Broadcasting System.

Some systems using electro-mechanical switching for microphone activation were engineered in the late 1960s and early 1970s. Peter W. Tappan and Robert F. Ancha devised a system of seat sensors that would activate one of 350 hidden microphones at the Seventeenth Church of Christ, Scientist in Chicago in 1970. From approximately 1968, Ken Patterson and Diversified Concepts developed a hardware system that could detect the number of open microphones (NOM) and attenuate the master output by an amount which increased with a higher number of microphones in use. This latter system was in the public domain.

In 1971, Gregory Maston of Bell Labs filed for a patent involving a circuit that could switch between several audio sources based on their levels. The loudest one was latched into the mix. This system did not ramp switched signals smoothly in and out and did not maintain a constant ambient noise level. It was intended for speakerphone conferencing applications. In 1972, Keith A. T. Knox with the British Post Office Corporation developed an adaptive threshold gate circuit intended for speakerphone usage. The system used a second microphone somewhat near the first to sense ambient noise level.

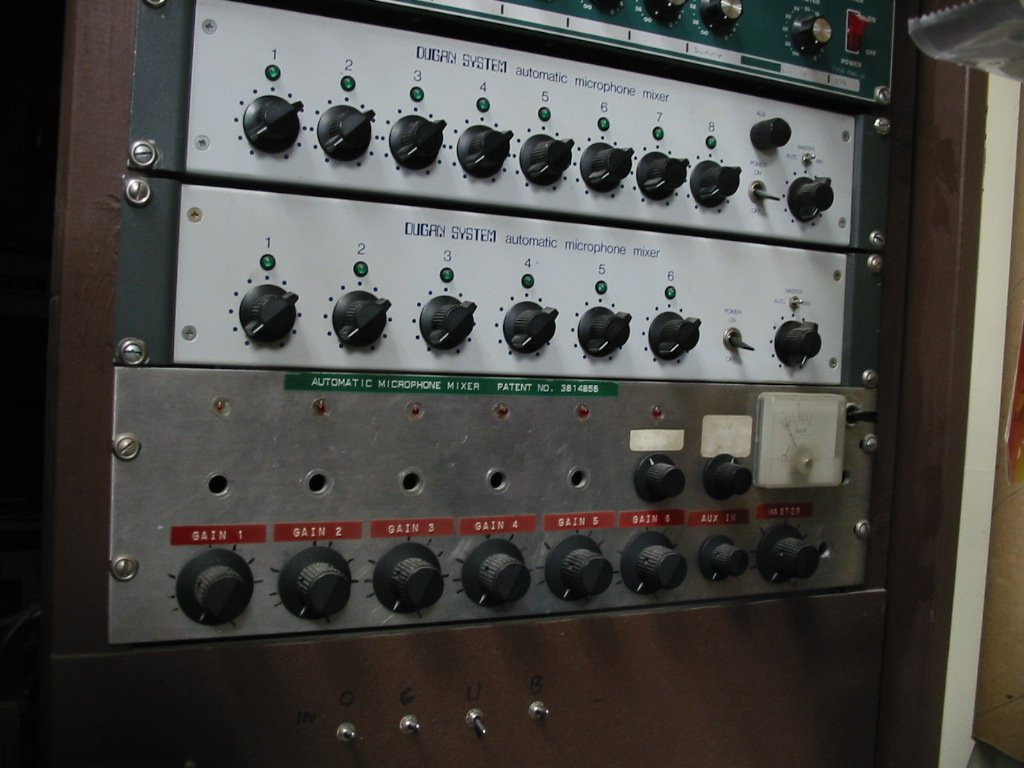
Dan Dugan's first automixers

Dan Dugan showed his first Adaptive Threshold Automatic Microphone Mixing System in 1974 at the 49th Audio Engineering Society (AES) meeting in New York, and was granted a patent for a control apparatus for sound reinforcement systems which sensed ambient sound level in the environment of a theater to control each microphone's level. In 1976, Dugan was granted a patent for an automatic microphone mixing process whereby the total gain of the system remains constant. He began manufacturing his first automixer system, the Model A, based on his two patents. Dugan built 60 units, with the first, hand-assembled one taken to Bell Labs to be installed in their conference room for Harvey Fletcher. The algorithm was simple and effective: "Each individual input channel is attenuated by an amount, in dB, equal to the difference, in dB, between that channel's level and the sum of all channel levels." Dugan licensed the system to Altec which released several automixer models including the 1674A, -B and -C series and the 1684A, all focusing on speech applications. The earliest Altec product implementation was regarded as inferior within the commercial audio contractor industry, and other manufacturers began to design their own automixer products.

In 1978, Richard W. Peters of Industrial Research Products (IRP) was granted an improvement patent entitled "Priority mixer control". IRP released the Voice-Matic series of 4 × 1 and 8 × 1 automatic mixers using "Dynamic Threshold Sensing" that weighed a combination of the amplitude and history of the signal to determine channel access. The master output was attenuated at the rate of 3 dB for every doubling of NOM. This master output reduction was the solution used by Yamaha Pro Audio two decades later in their DME series of digital signal processing (DSP) products, incorporating an automixer function which was otherwise an 8- or 16-channel noise gate.

Eugene Campbell and Terrance Whittemore of Colorado were granted a patent in 1982 for an automatic microphone mixing algorithm that allowed for musical performance mixing that would not be dominated by the loudest vocalist or instrumentalist.

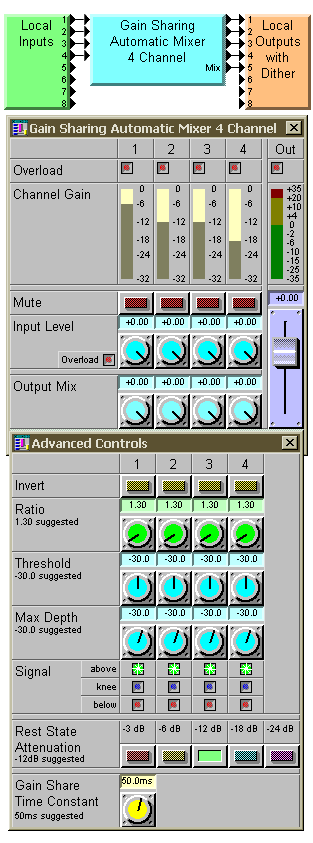
Graphic user interface for a digital automixer that uses a gain-sharing algorithm. Controls include threshold, depth, polarity inversion and muting for each input, as well as volume controls for the four inputs, the four individual outputs and the full mix output.

Stephen D. Julstrom of Shure Brothers Incorporated was granted a patent in 1987 for a teleconferencing system that used special directionally gated microphones mixed automatically and sent to a distant party via telephone line. The return signal from the distant party was compared in strength to the local mix to determine which party was to be most prominent in the overall mix. Any interrupting party was given priority. Four years later, Shure would introduce the AMS4000 and AMS8000 automixers for sound reinforcement; mixers which required the use of special directional condenser microphones of the Shure AMS Series.

In 1985, Innovative Electronic Designs (IED) introduced the circuit card frame-based auto mic mixing system featuring a combine-separate function and programmable gain control (PGC) modules. Combine-separate functionality is useful for ballroom applications with movable partitions that permit portions or all of a room to be used for one program or multiple programs. PGC modules compensate individual mic channel gain for soft-spoken or loud presenters, by slightly boosting or cutting channel gain, respectively.

At the 87th AES Convention in 1989, Dugan introduced the idea of using an automixer inserted within target channels on a professional audio mixer. Each microphone's signal would be interrupted inside its channel strip and sent to a variable gain circuit contained within the automixer. The signal would then be returned to the mixer at a level consistent with the Dugan algorithm. This became the Dugan Model D automixer.

In 1991, Dugan's patent expired. Competing manufacturers began to bring the Dugan algorithm directly to their product designs. In 1993, Travis M. Sims, Jr. of Lectrosonics (Rio Rancho, New Mexico) was granted a patent for a sound system with rate-controlled, variable attenuation of microphone inputs, including the Dugan algorithm as well as loudspeaker zone attenuation when in close proximity to an active microphone. The loudspeaker zone part of the patent cited a 1985 patent for proportional amplification by Eugene R. Griffith, Jr. of LVW Systems of Colorado Springs, a commercial audio contractor. In 1995, Sims and Lectrosonics gained another patent for an "Adaptive proportional gain audio mixing system" which incorporated a number of ideas, including the Dugan algorithm for maintaining a constant total gain of all the inputs.

In 1996, Dugan came out with the Model D-1, a speech-only economy model that did not offer the music capabilities of the Model D.

In 1997, John H. Roberts of Peavey Electronics was granted a patent for an automatic mixer priority circuit, enabling a hierarchy of logic weighting that allowed selected signals to push forward in the mix when they are in use, while still maintaining the useful constant unity, gain-sharing relationship first described by Dugan. The hierarchy enabled a host, moderator or chairperson to speak over other participants and retain control of the discussion. Peavey's Architectural Acoustics division used three levels of hierarchy in their 1998 "Automix 2" product, placing the first- and second-most influentially weighted sources at inputs 1 and 2, respectively.

Dan Dugan licensed his system to Protech Audio (Indian Lake, New York) in 1997, yielding the Protech 2000 model series.

In 2004, the first standard audio mixer incorporating an eight-channel automixer section was released by Peavey in their Sanctuary Series, and in 2006 the similar HP-W was introduced by Crest. Both mixers were aimed at the house of worship market, adding functions that ease the process of audio mixing for religious organizations.

In 2007, Mark W. Gilbert and Gregory H. Canfield of Shure (Niles, Illinois) were granted a patent for a digital microphone automixer system that used time of arrival as its main decision-making criteria.

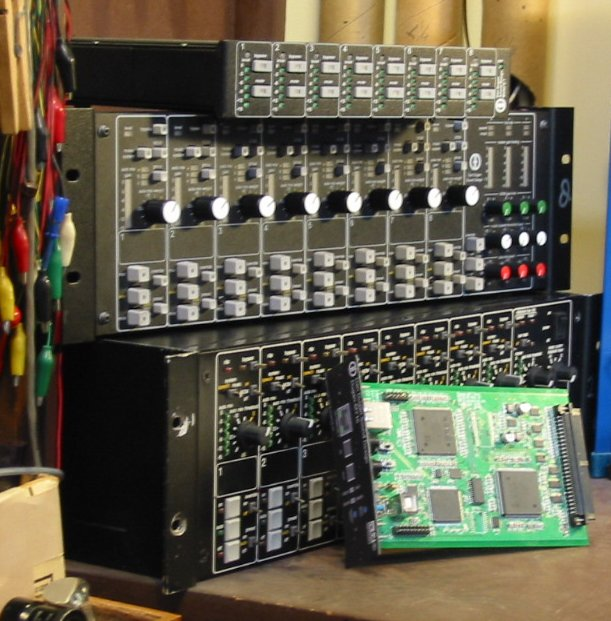
Generations of Dugan's insertable automixers

In February 2011, Dugan announced an automixer card to plug in the accessory slot of a Yamaha digital mixing console such as the LS-9, M7CL or PM-5D. This card, the Dugan-MY16, can mix 16 channels of microphone inputs at 44.1–48 kHz or 8 channels at 88.2–96 kHz sampling rates. Channels to be automixed are assigned in the mixer's graphic user interface and can then be controlled by a common web browser interface, affecting only the Dugan-MY16 card, allowing remote control with an iPad, touchscreen computer or laptop over a wireless network.

== Related applications ==
- Speech intelligibility enhancement, James M. Kates of Signatron (1984). This system uses Dugan's automatic mixing algorithm to reconstitute several spectral regions of a signal divided into frequency bands for short-time spectral analysis to achieve greater intelligibility of spoken consonants.
- Secure conferencing, patent by Raoul E. Drapeau (1993). An automixing algorithm attempts to mask incidental speech below the automix threshold but can be audible in the mix. The automix circuitry indicates which sources are active, and whether masking of low-level signals is occurring.

== See also ==
- Electronic mixer
- Variable-gain amplifier
