= Gene Johnson =

Gene Johnson may refer to:

- Gene Johnson (defensive back) (1935–1997), American football player
- Gene Johnson (quarterback) (born 1969), American football player
- Gene Johnson (high jumper) (born 1941), American high jumper
- Gene Johnson (coach) (1902–1989), American basketball and football coach
- Eugene Johnson (died 2019), American virologist
- Gene Johnson, member of Diamond Rio

== See also ==
- Jean Johnson (disambiguation)
