= Studiomaster =

British audio equipment manufacturer

Studiomaster is a British manufacturer of mixing consoles, power amplifiers, speaker cabinets, PA systems, and other professional audio equipment. It is a partner company of Carlsbro, which covers the instrument amplification side of the business. Studiomaster was established in the 1970s and the brand name is now under the umbrella of SCC Audio Ltd which is based in Milton Keynes, UK.
