= Ward-Beck Systems =

Canadian audio equipment manufacturer

Ward-Beck Systems Incorporated
- Industry: Professional audio design & engineering
- Founded: April 1967; 59 years ago
- Headquarters: Toronto, Ontario, Canada
- Key people: Ron W. Ward, Rodger K. Beck, Eugene Johnson

Ward-Beck Systems commonly referred to as Ward-Beck or simply WBS, is a Canadian manufacturer of broadcast audio and video equipment. It was founded in a garage in April 1967 by Ron W. Ward and director of engineering, Rodger K. Beck.

On January 26, 2021, Ward-Beck announced that it would "cease manufacturing operations" effective January 31, 2021, and that the company's intellectual property is available for sale.

== Customers and users ==
- Canadian Broadcasting Corporation
- CTV Television Network
- VOA
- XM Radio
- NEP Broadcasting
- NBC
- American Broadcasting Company
- CNN
- The CHUM Group
- Much Music
- Bravo!
- Radio New Zealand
- Rawlco Radio
- Rogers Communications
- Corus Entertainment
- Bill Kennedy
- Hotel2Tango
- Bedside Studios
- Doug Grean
- Maritime Broadcasting System

== Ward-Beck Systems Preservation Society (WBSPS) ==
The Ward-Beck Systems Preservation Society was founded in 2005 by Tony Kuzub. The goal and objective of the WBSPS is to keep vintage Ward-Beck equipment running and working by supplying a database of documentation, knowledge, and support. There are only a handful of consoles still in existence and use, and the WBSPS is dedicated to keeping these consoles in use and maintained. Many manuals have been scanned in their entirety and posted for all to learn from. The WBSPS was given permission by Eugene Johnson of Ward-Beck to publish information regarding vintage WBS equipment. The WBSPS is not directly or in-directly associated with Ward-Beck Systems Incorporated.
