= Speck Electronics =

American audio equipment manufacturer

Speck Electronics manufactures professional audio mixers, equalizers, and microphone preamps. The company was founded in Los Angeles in 1973 by designer and engineer Vince Poulos, who remains active in the company to this day.

From 1973 through 1986, Speck's primary product was a 16-32 input, 8 bus "in-line" recording console. Speck was one of the earliest U.S. manufacturers of professional quality consoles. Their mixer design was modular allowing the consoles to be manufactured at a less expensive cost than competing semi-custom designs of the time.

Speck's current product lineup includes parametric equalizers, mixing consoles, analog line mixers, and microphone preamplifiers.

Speck moved their operations to Fallbrook, California in 1986.
