= Jean Johnson =

Jean Johnson may refer to:

- Jean Johnson (singer)
- Jean Bassett Johnson, anthropologist
- Jean Johnson, character in Cheetah (1989 film)
- Jean Johnson (writer), Philip K. Dick Award nominee

== See also ==
- Gene Johnson (disambiguation)
- John Johnson (disambiguation)
