= Mixing console =

Device used for audio mixing

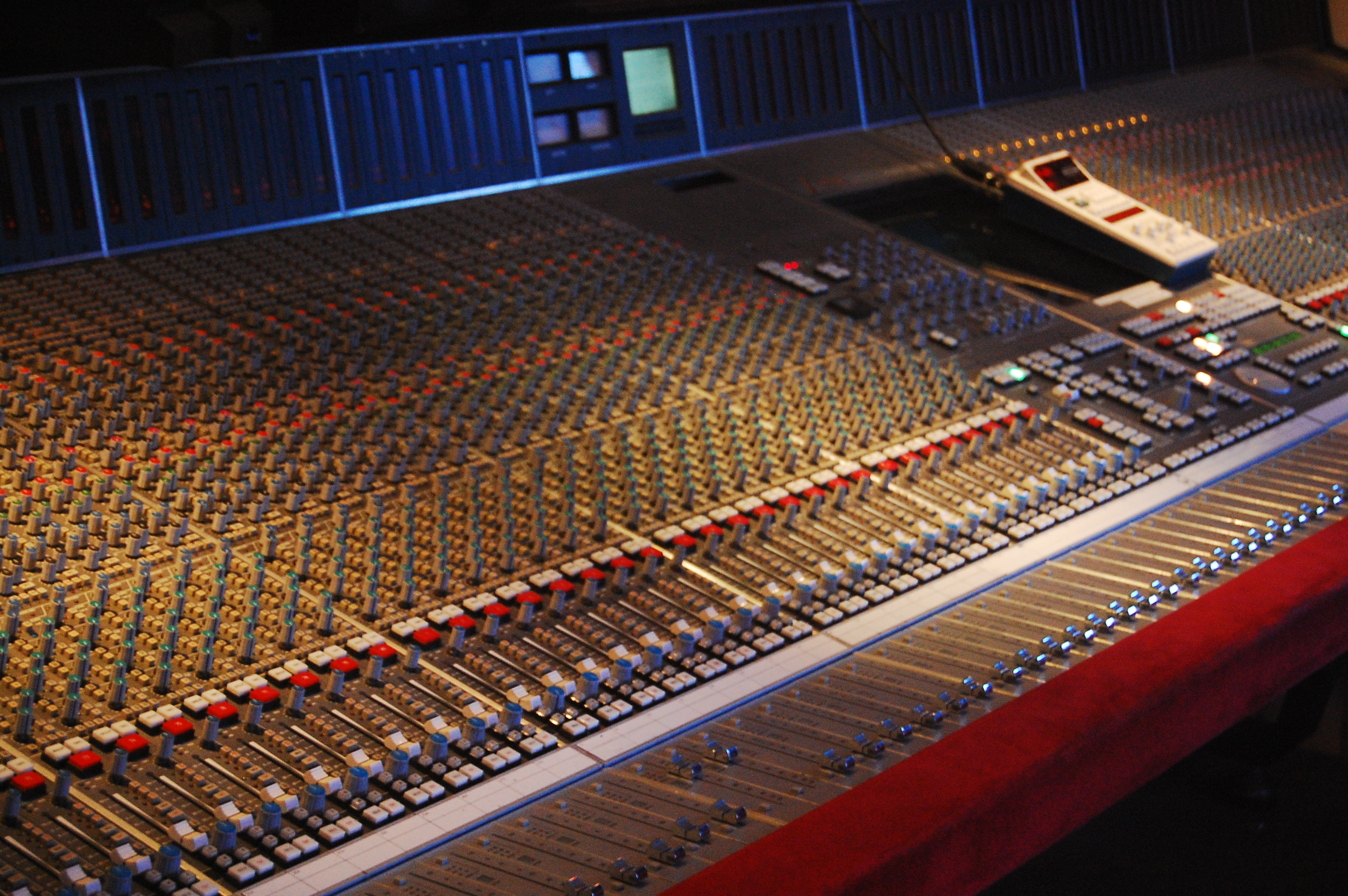
SSL SL9000J (72-channel) console at Cutting Room Recording Studio, New York City

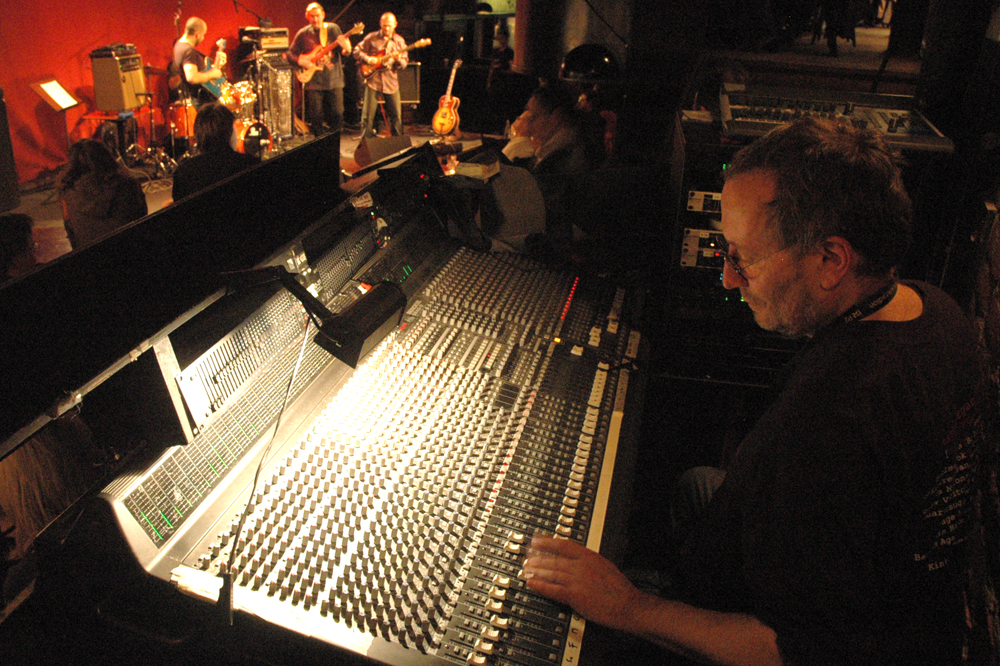
An audio engineer adjusts a mixer while doing live sound for a band.

A mixing console or mixing desk is an electronic device for mixing audio signals, used in sound recording and reproduction and sound reinforcement systems. Inputs to the console include microphones, signals from electric or electronic instruments, or recorded sounds. Mixers may handle analog or digital signals. The signals are summed to produce the combined output signals, which can then be broadcast, amplified through a sound reinforcement system or recorded.

Mixing consoles are used for applications including recording studios, public address systems, sound reinforcement systems, nightclubs, broadcasting, and post-production. A typical, simple application combines signals from microphones on stage into an amplifier that drives one set of loudspeakers for the audience. A DJ mixer may have only two channels, for mixing two record players. A coffeehouse's small stage might only have a six-channel mixer, enough for two singer-guitarists and a percussionist. A nightclub stage's mixer for rock music shows may have 24 channels for mixing the signals from a rhythm section, lead guitar and several vocalists. A mixing console in a professional recording studio may have as many as 96 channels. Consoles used for live sound can go even higher, with some having up to 384 input channels.

In practice, mixers do more than simply mix signals. They can provide phantom power for condenser microphones or active DI boxes; pan control, which changes a sound's apparent position in the stereo field; filtering and equalization, which enables sound engineers to boost or cut selected frequencies to improve the sound; dynamic range compression, which allows engineers to increase the overall gain of the system or channel without exceeding the dynamic limits of the system; routing facilities, to send the signal from the mixer to another device, such as a sound recording system or a control room; and monitoring facilities, whereby one of a number of sources can be routed to loudspeakers or headphones for listening, often without affecting the mixer's main output. Some mixers have onboard electronic effects, such as reverb. Some mixers intended for small venue live performance applications may include an integrated power amplifier.

== Terminology ==
A mixing console is also known as an audio mixer, audio console, mixing desk, sound mixer, soundboard, or simply as a board or mixer.

== Structure ==
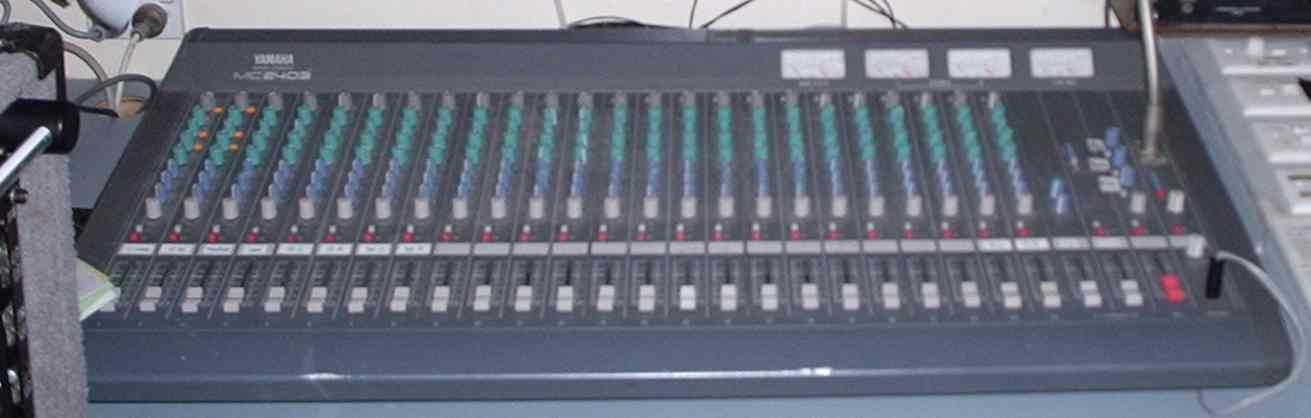
Yamaha 2403 audio mixing console in a 'live' mixing application

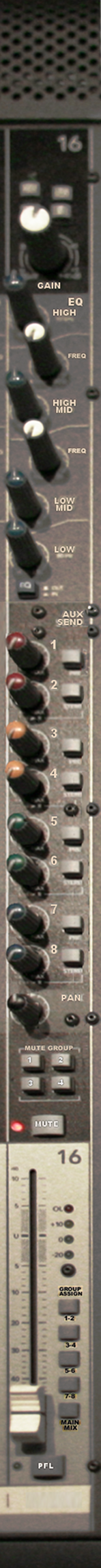
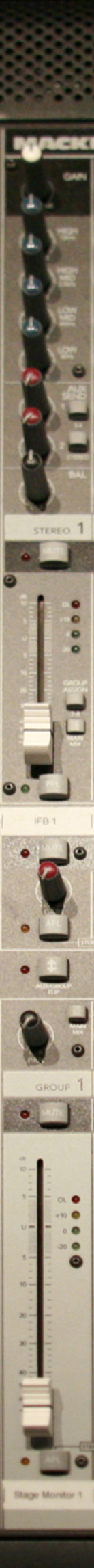
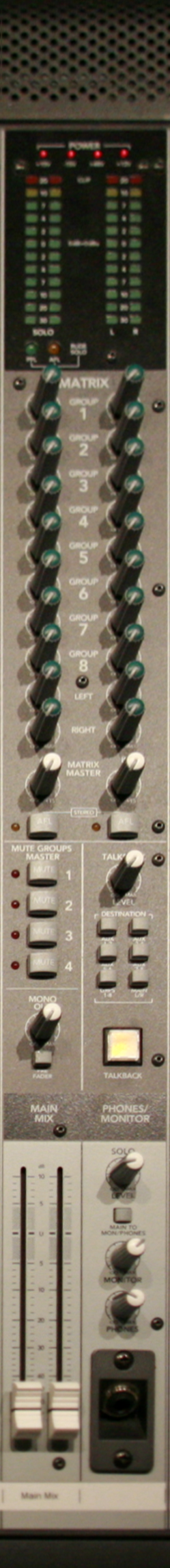
Channel input strip, Group, and Master section on Mackie ONYX 80

An analog mixing board is divided into functional sections. Some of the more important functional sections are subdivided into subsections.

=== Channel input strip ===
The channel input strips are usually a bank of identical monaural or stereo input channels arranged in columns. Typically, each channel's column contains a number of rotary potentiometer knobs, buttons, and faders for controlling the gain of the input preamplifier, adjusting the equalization of the signal on each channel, controlling routing of the input signal to other functional sections, and adjusting the channel's contribution to the overall mix being produced.

The types of inputs that can be plugged into a mixer depend on the intended purpose of the mixer. A mixer intended for a live venue or a recording studio typically has a range of input jacks, such as XLR connectors for microphones and the outputs from DI boxes, and 1/4-inch jacks for line level sources. A DJ mixer typically has RCA connector inputs for pre-recorded music being played back on turntables or CD players, and a single mic input.

Depending on the mixer, a channel may have buttons that enable the audio engineer to reroute the signal to a different output for monitoring purposes, turn on an attenuator pad (often reducing the signal by 15 or 20 dB to prevent audio clipping), or activate other features, such as a high-pass filter. Some higher-priced mixers have a parametric equalizer or a semi-parametric equalizer for one or more of the equalizer frequency bands, often the middle range.

The channel strips are typically numbered so that the audio engineer can identify the different channels. For each channel input, a mixer provides one or more input jacks. On consoles for mid- to large-sized live venues, and sound recording consoles, these input jacks are numbered and consolidated in a patch bay. On smaller mixers, the input jacks may be mounted on the top panel of the mixer to facilitate the connection and disconnection of inputs during the use of the mixer.

The input strip is usually separated into sections:

- Input jacks
- Microphone preamplifiers
- Equalization
- Dynamics processing (e.g. dynamic range compression, gating), if supported
- Routing, including direct outs, auxiliary-sends, panning control, and subgroup assignments
- Level-control faders (on small mixers, these may be rotary knobs to save space and cost)

On many consoles, these sections are color-coded for quick identification by the operator. Each signal (e.g., a singer's vocal mic, the signal from an electric bass amp's DI box, etc.) that is plugged into the mixer has its own channel. Depending on the specific mixer, each channel is stereo or monaural. On most mixers, each channel has an XLR input, and many have RCA or quarter-inch TRS phone connector line inputs. The smallest, least expensive mixers may only have one XLR input, with the other inputs being line inputs. These can be used by a singer-guitarist or other small acts.

==== Basic input controls ====
The first knob at the top of an input strip is typically a trim or gain control. The input/preamp conditions the signal from the external device and this controls the amount of amplification or attenuation that is applied to the input signal to bring it to a nominal level for processing. Due to the high gains involved (around +50 dB, for a microphone), this stage is where most noise and interference is picked up. Balanced inputs and connectors, such as XLR or phone connectors that have been specifically wired as balanced lines, reduce interference problems.

A microphone plugged directly into a power amplifier would not produce an adequate signal level to drive loudspeakers, because the microphone's signal is too weak; the microphone signal needs a preamplifier to strengthen the signal so that it is strong enough for the power amplifier. For some very strong line level signals, the signal that is plugged into the mixer may be too strong and cause audio clipping. For signals that are too strong, a 15 dB or 20 dB pad can be used to attenuate the signal. Both preamplifiers and pads, and the controls associated with them, are available in the input section of most mixing consoles.

Audio engineers typically aim at achieving a good gain structure for each channel. To obtain a good gain structure, engineers usually raise the gain as high as they can before audio clipping results; this helps to provide the best signal-to-noise ratio.

A mixing console may provide insert points after the input gain stage. These provide send and return connections for external processors that only affect an individual channel's signal. Effects that operate on multiple channels connect to auxiliary sends (below).

==== Auxiliary send routing ====
The auxiliary send routes a split of the incoming signal to an auxiliary bus, which can then be routed to external devices. Auxiliary sends can either be pre-fader or post-fader, in that the level of a pre-fader send is set by the auxiliary send control, whereas post-fader sends depend on the position of the channel fader as well. Auxiliary sends can send the signal to an external processor, such as a reverb, with the return signal routed through another channel or designated auxiliary return. Post-fader sends are normally used in this case. Pre-fader auxiliary sends can provide a monitor mix to musicians on stage (which they hear through monitor speakers pointing at the performers or in-ear monitors); this mix is thus independent of the main mix produced by the faders.

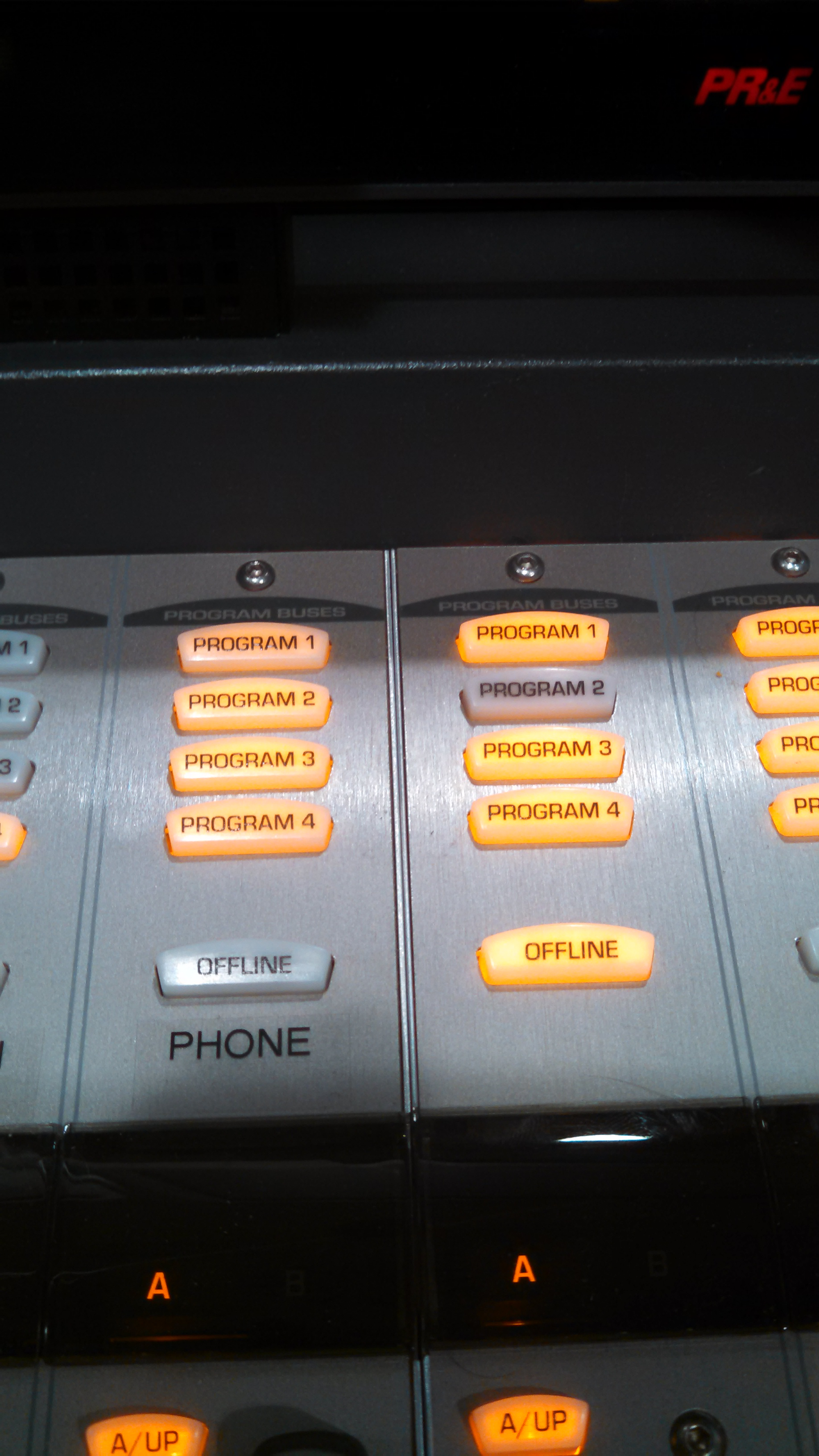
Program channels on a radio soundboard

Most live radio broadcasting soundboards send audio through program channels. Most boards have 3-4 program channels, though some have more options. When a given channel button is selected, the audio will be sent to that device or transmitter. Program 1 is typically the on-air live feed, or what those listening to the broadcast will hear. Other program channels may feed one or more computers used for editing or sound playback. Another program channel may be used to send audio to the talent's headset if they are broadcasting from a remote area.

=== Channel equalization ===
Further channel controls affect the equalization of the signal by separately attenuating or boosting a range of frequencies. The smallest, least expensive mixers may only have bass and treble controls. Most mid-range and higher-priced mixers have bass, midrange, and treble, or even additional mid-range controls (e.g., low-mid and high-mid). Many high-end mixing consoles have parametric equalization on each channel. Some mixers have a general equalization control (either graphic or parametric) at the output, for controlling the tone of the overall mix.

==== Cue system ====
The cue system allows the operator to listen to one or more selected signals without affecting the console's main outputs. A sound engineer can use the cue feature to, for instance, get a sound recording they wish to play soon cued up to the start point of a song, without the listeners hearing these actions. The signal from the cue system is fed to the console's headphone amp and may also be available as a line-level output that is intended to drive a monitor speaker system. The terms AFL (after-fader listen) and PFL (pre-fader listen) are used to describe, respectively, whether or not the level of the cue signal for an input is controlled by the corresponding fader. Consoles with a cue feature have a dedicated button on each channel, typically labeled Cue, AFL, PFL, Solo, or Listen. When cue is enabled on multiple channels, a mix of these signals is heard through the cue system.

Solo in place (SIP) is a related feature on advanced consoles. It is typically controlled by the cue button, but unlike cue, SIP affects the output mix; It mutes everything except the channel or channels being soloed. SIP is useful for setting up a mixing board and troubleshooting, in that it allows the operator to quickly mute everything but the signal being adjusted. For example, if an audio engineer is having problems with clipping on an input, they may use SIP to solely hear that channel, so that the problem can be diagnosed and addressed. SIP is potentially disastrous if engaged accidentally during a performance, as it will mute all the channels except one, so most consoles require the operator to take very deliberate actions to engage SIP.

==== Busses and submix ====
Each channel on a mixer has a volume control (fader) that allows adjustment of the level of that channel. These are usually sliders near the front of the mixing board, although some smaller mixers use rotary controls to save space. The signals are summed to create the main mix, or combined on a bus as a submix, a group of channels that are then added as a whole to the final mix. For instance, many drum mics could be grouped into a bus, and then the proportion of drums in the final mix can be controlled with one bus fader. A bus can often be processed just like an individual input channel, allowing the engineer to process a whole group of signals at once. Once again using the drum kit example, the use of bus-processing can enable the sound engineer to run all of the drum kit through an audio compressor effect to reduce unwanted signal peaks, rather than having to route all of the 10 or more mic signals on the drum kit individually. There may also be insert points for a certain bus or even the entire mix.

==== VCA groups ====
Some higher-end consoles use voltage-controlled amplifiers (VCAs). VCAs function somewhat like a submix, but let the operator control the level of multiple input channels with a single fader. Unlike subgroups, no sub-mix is created. The audio signals from the assigned channels remain routed independently of VCA assignments. Since no sub-mix is created, it is not possible to insert processing such as compressors into a VCA group. In addition, on most VCA-equipped consoles, post-fader auxiliary send levels are affected by the VCA master. This is usually desirable, as post-fader auxiliary sends are commonly used for effects such as reverb, and sends to these effects should track changes in the channel signal level. When implemented on a digital console, the same functionality may be referred to as a DCA or control group (CG), depending on the brand of mixer.

For example, if an engineer wishes to control microphones for three background vocalists at one time, muting them or changing their volume relative to a lead singer, they might create a VCA rather than adjusting all three volumes separately. A sub-mix would be useful if they wanted to process all the singers together, adding the same amount of reverb or compression to each, but the VCA allows each channel to retain its distinctive processing while giving the engineer the ability to quickly adjust the group's volume or mute them.

=== Master output controls ===
The master control section is used to adjust the levels of the overall output of the mixer. The master control section on a large live venue or sound recording mixer typically has sub-group faders, master faders, master auxiliary mixing bus level controls and auxiliary return level controls. On most mixers, the master control is a fader. However, on some small mixers, rotary knobs are used instead to save space (and cost).

In a typical live sound mixing context, with a band playing at a venue, consisting of a rhythm section, solo instrumentalists and singers, the master control section allows the audio engineer to control the volume of the entire group with just one fader (for monaural mixers) or a pair of left and right faders (for stereo mixers).

Subgroup and main output fader controls are often found together on the right-hand side of the mixer or, on larger consoles, in a center section flanked by banks of input channels. Matrix routing is often contained in this master section, as are headphone and local loudspeaker monitoring controls. Talkback controls allow conversation with the artist through their monitors, headphones or in-ear monitor. A test tone generator might be located in the master output section. Aux returns, such as those signals returning from external processors, are often in the master section.

=== Metering ===
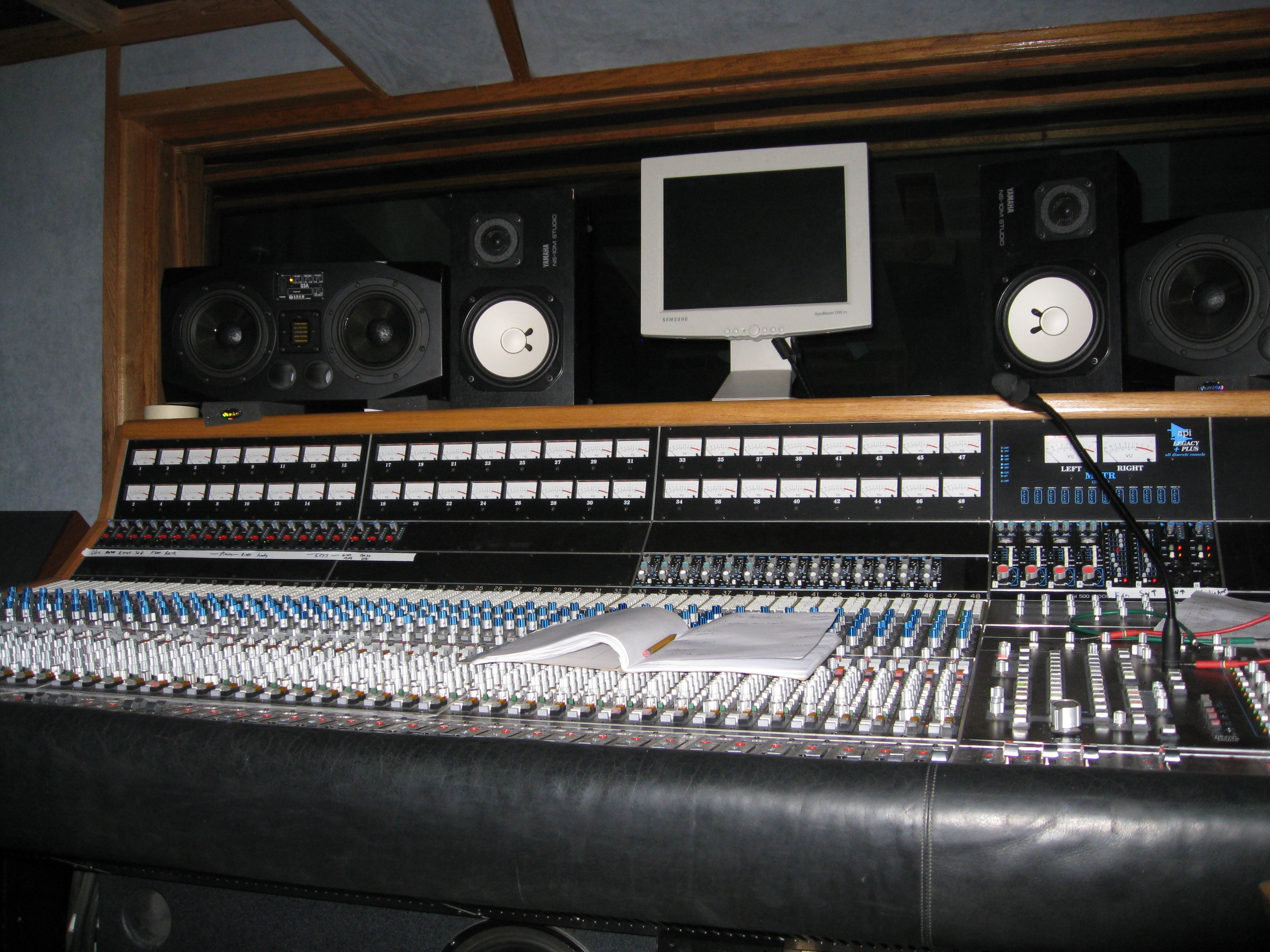
Meter bridge on API Legacy Plus console

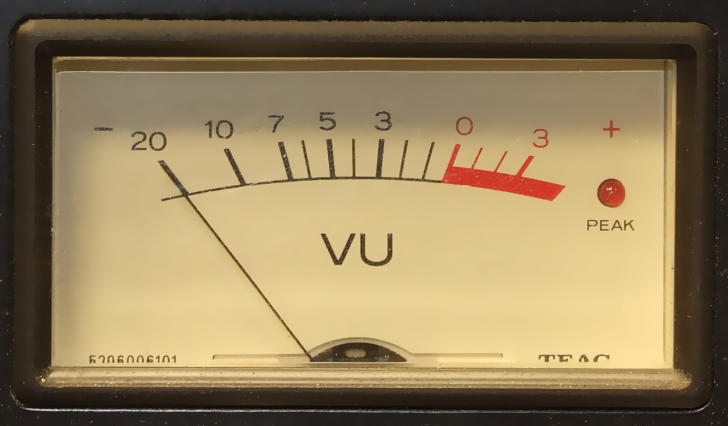
⇑ VU meter

⇐ Peak program meter

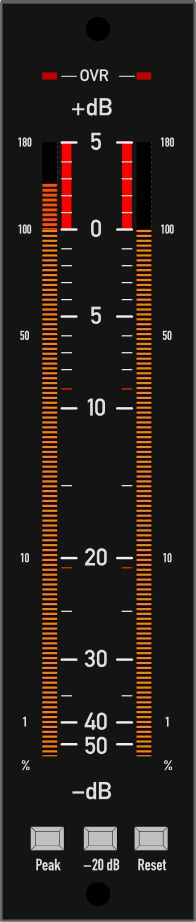

There are usually one or more VU or peak meters (Note: Peak meters often use LEDs) to indicate the levels for each channel, for the master outputs and to indicate whether the console levels are clipping the signal. The sound engineer typically adjusts the gain of the input signals to get the strongest signal that can be obtained without causing clipping. Having the gain set as high as possible improves the signal-to-noise ratio. Most mixers have at least one additional output besides the main mix. These are either individual bus outputs or auxiliary outputs, used, for instance, to output a different mix to onstage monitors.

The meters may be above the input and master sections, or they may be integrated into the input and master sections themselves. Meters may have needles or LEDs. On meters using LEDs, there may be different colored LEDs to indicate when there is signal present in the channel's input; the audio level of the channel, typically by lighting up more LEDs; and clipping, which may be indicated using a different colored LED. In one popular color-coding system, green LEDs indicate signal presence and the audio level; one or more amber LEDs indicate that the channel is approaching clipping; and one or more red LEDs indicate clipping.

As the human ear experiences audio level in a logarithmic fashion, (Note: The logarithmic response applies both to amplitude and frequency.) mixing console controls and displays are almost always labeled in decibels, a logarithmic measurement system. Since the decibel represents a relative measurement, and not a unit itself, the meters must be referenced to a nominal level. Most professional audio equipment is referenced to a nominal level of +4 dBu, while semi-professional and domestic equipment is usually referenced to a nominal level of −10 dBV.

=== Hardware routing and patching ===
For convenience, some mixing consoles include inserts or a patch bay or patch panel. Patch bays are more common in recording mixers than live sound mixers. In live sound, the cables from the onstage microphones and instrument outputs are not typically plugged directly into the mixer, because this would require a large number of individual cables to go from the stage to the mixer. Instead, the onstage mic and instrument cables are typically plugged into the stage box of a snake cable, which runs from the stage to the mixer. The snake is then plugged into the mixer.

== Other features ==
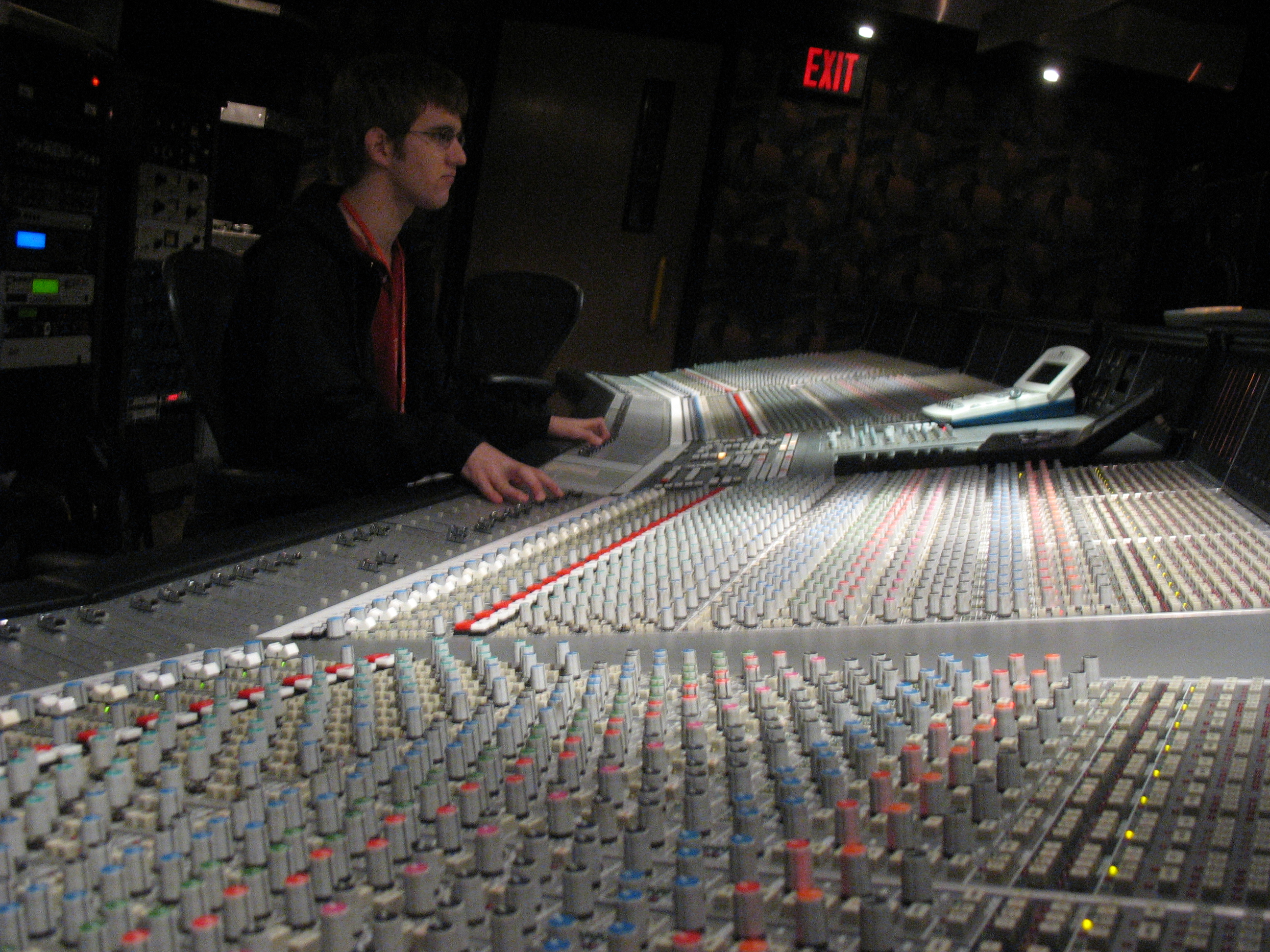
A sound engineer at the controls of a SSL9000J mixer

Most, but not all, audio mixers can

- use monaural signals to produce simulated stereo sound through panning.
- provide phantom power required by condenser microphones.

Some mixers can

- add onboard external effect units (reverb, echo, delay). Mixers with onboard digital effects typically offer a wide range of these effects.
- create an audible test tone via an oscillator. The test tone can be used to troubleshoot issues before the band arrives and determine if channels are functioning properly.
- read and write console automation.
- be interfaced with computers or other recording equipment.
- control or be controlled by a digital audio workstation via MIDI, USB or other communication interface.
- be powered by batteries. (Note: Only the smallest mixers, such as four- to six-channel mixers that might be used on location outdoors, have a battery option.)
- provide amplifier power for external passive speakers

=== Mirroring ===
Some mixing consoles, particularly those designed for broadcast and live sound, include facilities for mirroring two consoles, making both consoles exact copies of each other with the same inputs and outputs, the same settings, and the same audio mix. There are two primary reasons for doing this; one, in the event of a hardware failure, a second redundant console is already in place and can be switched to (an important feature for live broadcasts); second, it allows the operators to set up two identical mix positions, one at front of house—where the audio will be mixed during a performance—and the other at some other location within the theater (e.g., with the broadcasting equipment); this way, if the acoustics at front of house are unfavorable, a mix can be programmed at an acoustically better position in the room, and the presets (on the faders and knobs) can be accessed from the front of house console during the performance.

== Digital versus analog ==
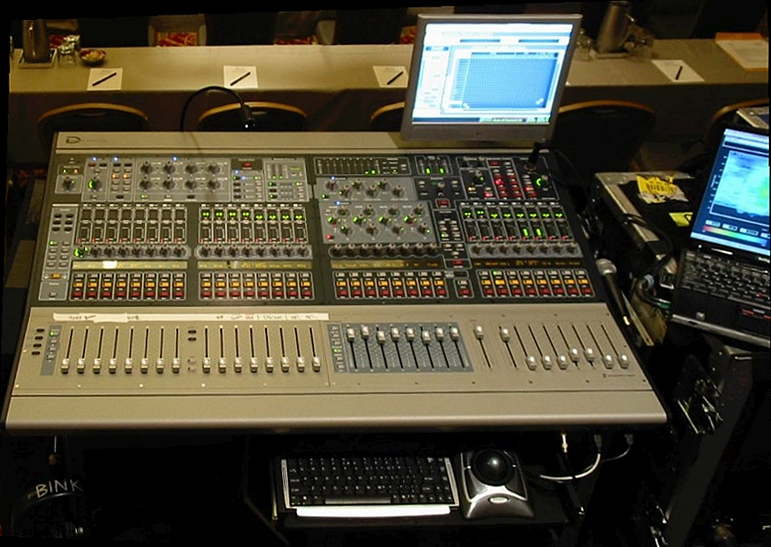
Digidesign's Venue Profile mixer on location at a corporate event. This digital mixer allows audio plug-ins from third-party vendors.

Digital mixing console sales have increased dramatically since their introduction in the 1990s. Yamaha sold more than 1000 PM5D mixers by July 2005, and other manufacturers are seeing increasing sales of their digital products. Digital mixers are more versatile than analog ones and offer many new features, such as reconfiguration of all signal routing at the touch of a button. In addition, digital consoles often include processing capabilities such as compression, gating, reverb, automatic feedback suppression and delay. Some products are expandable via third-party audio plug-ins that add further reverb, compression, delay and tone-shaping tools. Several digital mixers include spectrograph and real-time analyzer functions. A few incorporate loudspeaker management tools such as crossover filtering and limiting. Digital signal processing can perform automatic mixing for some simple applications, such as courtrooms, conferences and panel discussions.

=== Latency ===
Digital mixers have an unavoidable amount of latency, ranging from less than 1 ms to as much as 10 ms, depending on the model of digital mixer and what functions are engaged. This small amount of latency is not a problem for loudspeakers aimed at the audience and not necessarily a problem for monitor wedges aimed at the artist, but can be disorienting and unpleasant for in-ear monitors where the artist hears their voice acoustically in their head and electronically amplified in their ears but delayed by a couple of milliseconds.

Every analog to digital conversion and digital to analog conversion within a digital mixer introduces latency. Audio inserts to favorite external analog processors make for approximately double the usual latency. Further latency can be traced to format conversions such as from ADAT to AES3 and from normal digital signal processing steps.

Within a digital mixer, there can be differing amounts of latency, depending on the routing and on how much DSP is in use. Assigning a signal to two parallel paths with significantly different processing on each path can result in comb filtering when recombined. Some digital mixers incorporate internal methods of latency correction so that such problems are avoided.

=== Ease of use ===
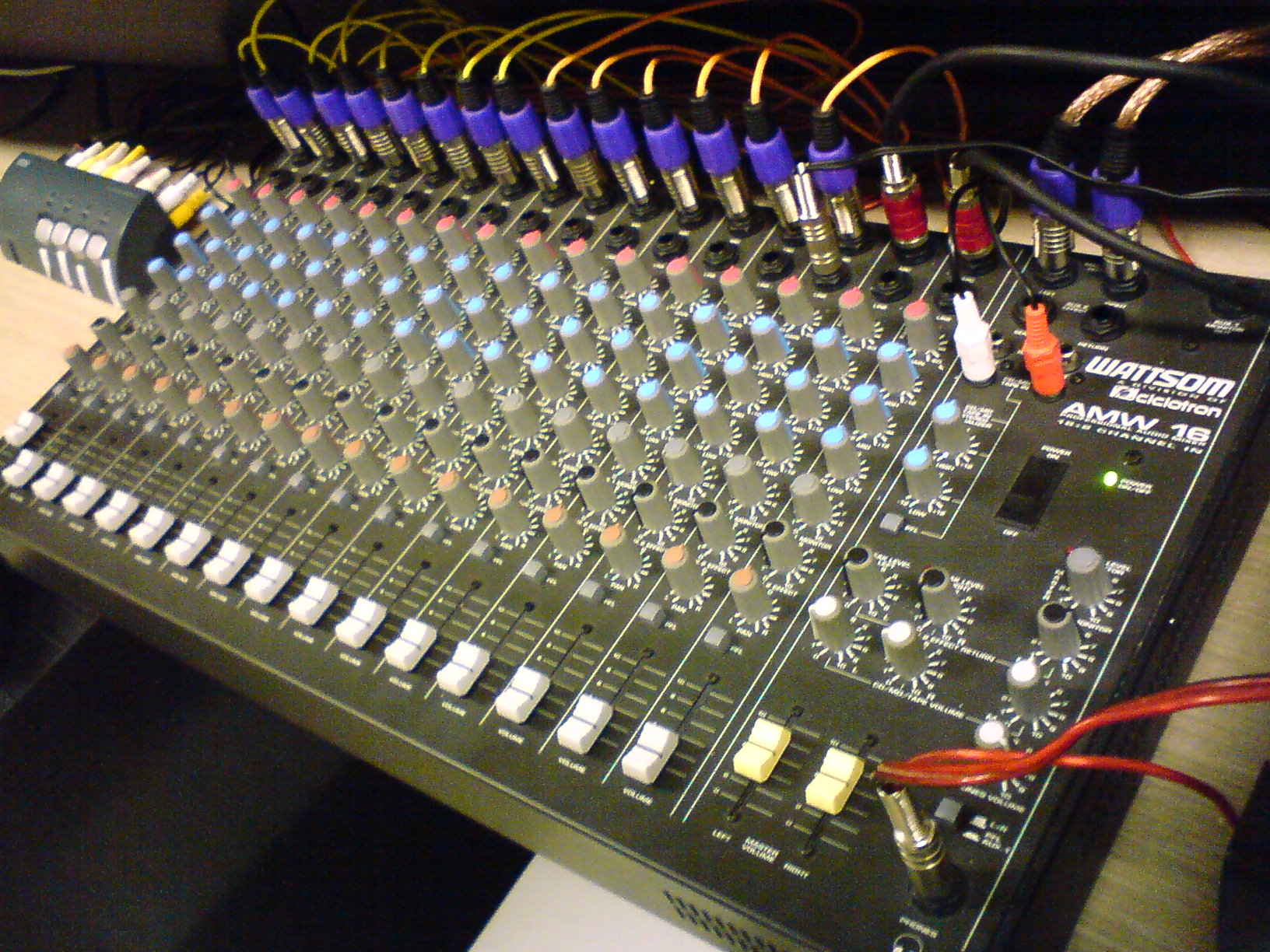
16-channel mixing console with compact short-throw faders

Analog consoles have a column of dedicated physical knobs, buttons, and faders for each single channel. This takes more physical space but ends up accommodating rapid responses to changing performance conditions.

Most digital mixers use technology to reduce physical space requirements, entailing compromises in user interface, such as a single shared channel adjustment area that is selectable for only one channel at a time. Additionally, most digital mixers have virtual pages or layers that change fader banks into separate controls for additional inputs or for adjusting equalization or aux send levels. This layering can be confusing for some operators. Many digital mixers allow internal reassignment of inputs so that convenient groupings of inputs appear near each other in the fader bank, a feature that can be disorienting for persons having to make a hardware patch change.

On the other hand, many digital mixers allow for extremely easy building of a mix from saved data. USB flash drives and other storage methods are employed to bring past performance data to a new venue in a highly portable manner. At the new venue, the traveling mix engineer simply plugs the collected data into the venue's digital mixer and quickly makes small adjustments to the local input and output patch layout, allowing for full show readiness in very short order. Some digital mixers allow offline editing of the mix, a feature that lets the traveling technician use a laptop to make anticipated changes to the show, shortening the time it takes to prepare the sound system for the artist.

=== Sound quality ===
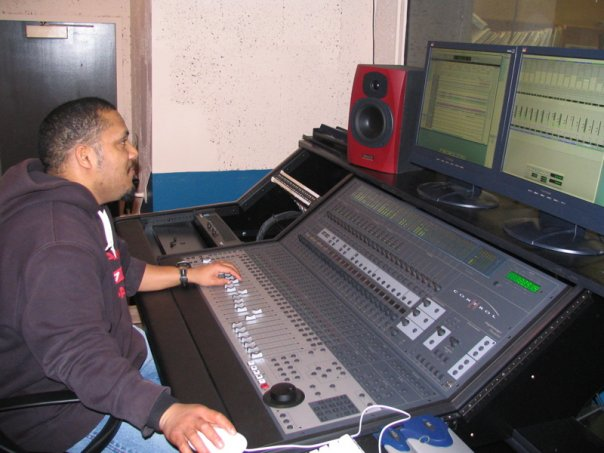
A studio engineer at a Control 24 mixing surface

Both digital and analog mixers rely on analog microphone preamplifiers, a high-gain circuit that increases the low signal level from a microphone to a level that is better matched to the console's internal operating level.

In a digital mixer, the microphone preamplifier is followed by an analog-to-digital converter. Ideally, this process is carefully engineered to deal gracefully with overloading and clipping while delivering an accurate digital stream. Overloading during further processing and mixing of digital streams can be avoided by using floating-point arithmetic. Intermediate processing in older systems using fixed-point arithmetic and final output in all digital systems must be controlled to avoid saturation.

Analog mixers, too, must deal gracefully with overloading and clipping at the microphone preamplifier, as well as avoiding overloading of mix buses. Noise is present at all stages of an analog mixer, though good gain stage management and turning unused channels down to zero minimizes its audibility. Digital circuitry is generally more resistant to outside interference from radio transmitters such as walkie-talkies and cell phones.

Many electronic design elements combine to affect perceived sound quality, making the global "analog mixer vs. digital mixer" question difficult to answer. Experienced live sound professionals agree that the selection and quality of the microphones and loudspeakers (with their innate higher potential for creating distortion) are a much greater source of coloration of sound than the choice of mixer. The mixing style and experience of the person mixing may be more important than the make and model of audio console. Analog and digital mixers have both been associated with high-quality concert performances and studio recordings.

=== Remote control ===
Since the option first appeared associated with analog mixing in the 1990s as wired remote controls for certain digital processes, such as monitor wedge equalization and parameter changes in outboard reverb devices, the concept has expanded until wired and wireless remote controls are being seen in relation to entire digital mixing platforms. It is possible to set up a sound system and mix via laptop, touchscreen or tablet. Computer networks can connect digital system elements for expanded monitoring and control, allowing the system technician to make adjustments to distant devices during the performance. The use of remote control technology can reduce the amount of venue space used for the front-of-house mixing console and recover space for audience seating.

=== Software mixers ===
For recorded sound, the mixing process can be performed on screen, using computer software and associated input, output and recording hardware. The traditional large control surface of the mixing console is not necessarily utilized. In a software studio, there is either no physical mixer fader bank at all or there is a compact group of motorized faders designed to fit into a small space and connected to the computer. Many project studios use such a space-efficient solution, as the mixing room at other times can serve as the business office, media archive, etc. Software mixing is integrated as part of a digital audio workstation.

== Applications ==
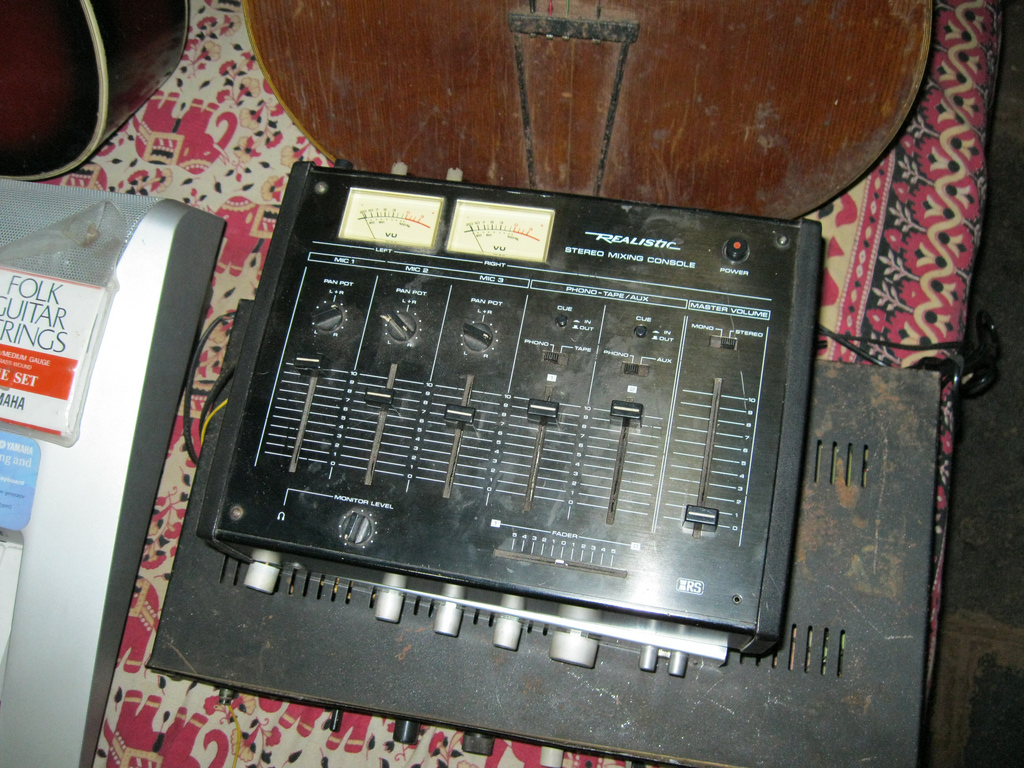
A small mixer that could be used for a singer-guitarist's performance at a small coffeehouse

Public address systems in schools, hospitals and other institutions use a mixing console to set microphones to an appropriate level and can add in recorded sounds such as music into the mix. PA mixers usually have controls that help to minimize audio feedback.

Most rock and pop bands use a mixing console to combine musical instruments and vocals so that the mix can be amplified through a nightclub's PA system. Among the highest quality bootleg recordings of live performances are so-called soundboard recordings sourced directly from the mixing console.

Radio broadcasts use a mixing desk to select audio from different sources, such as CD players, telephones, remote feeds, prerecorded advertisements, and in-studio live bands. These consoles, often referred to as air-boards are apt to have many fewer controls than mixers designed for live or studio production mixing, dropping pan/balance, EQ, and multi-bus monitoring/aux feed knobs in favor of cue and output bus selectors, since, in a radio studio, nearly all sources are prerecorded or pre-adjusted.

DJs playing music at a dance club use a small DJ mixer to make smooth transitions between songs that are played from sources that are plugged into the mixer. Compared with other mixers that are used in sound recording and live sound, DJ mixers have far fewer inputs. The most basic DJ mixers have only two inputs, though some have four or more inputs for DJs using a larger number of sources. These sources could include turntables, CD players, portable media players, or electronic instruments such as drum machines or synthesizers. The DJ mixer also allows the DJ to use headphones to cue the next song to the desired starting point before playing it.

Hip-hop DJs and Dub producers and engineers were early users of the mixing board as a musical instrument. In the 1970s, hip-hop DJs developed a technique of adjusting the fader and crossfader controls of mixers at the same time as they manipulated records on turntables, creating unique rhythmic scratching effects.

Noise music musicians may create feedback loops within mixers, creating an instrument known as a no-input mixer. The tones generated from a no-input mixer are created by connecting an output of the mixer to an input channel and manipulating the pitch with the mixer's dials.

== Gallery ==
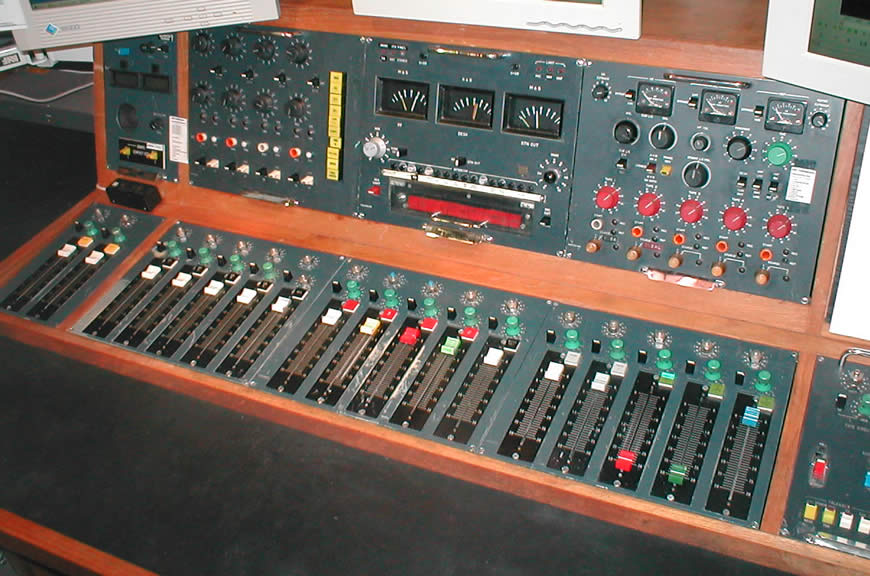
BBC Local Radio Mark III radio mixing desk

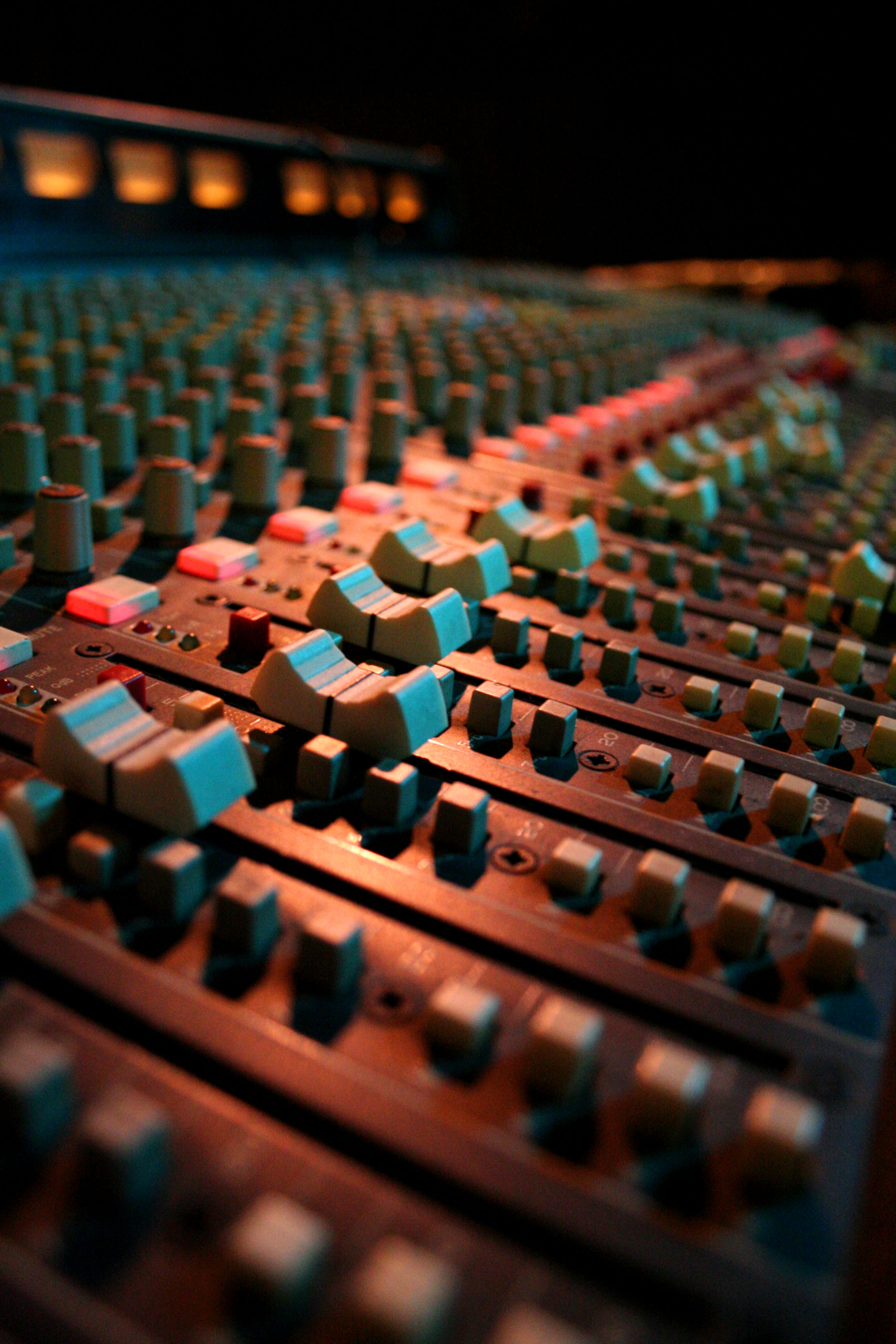
Allen & Heath mixing desk for live performance

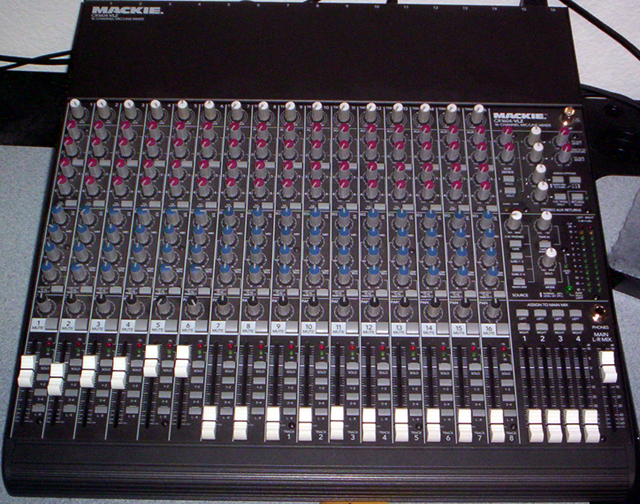
Mackie CR1604-VLZ mixing console in a home studio

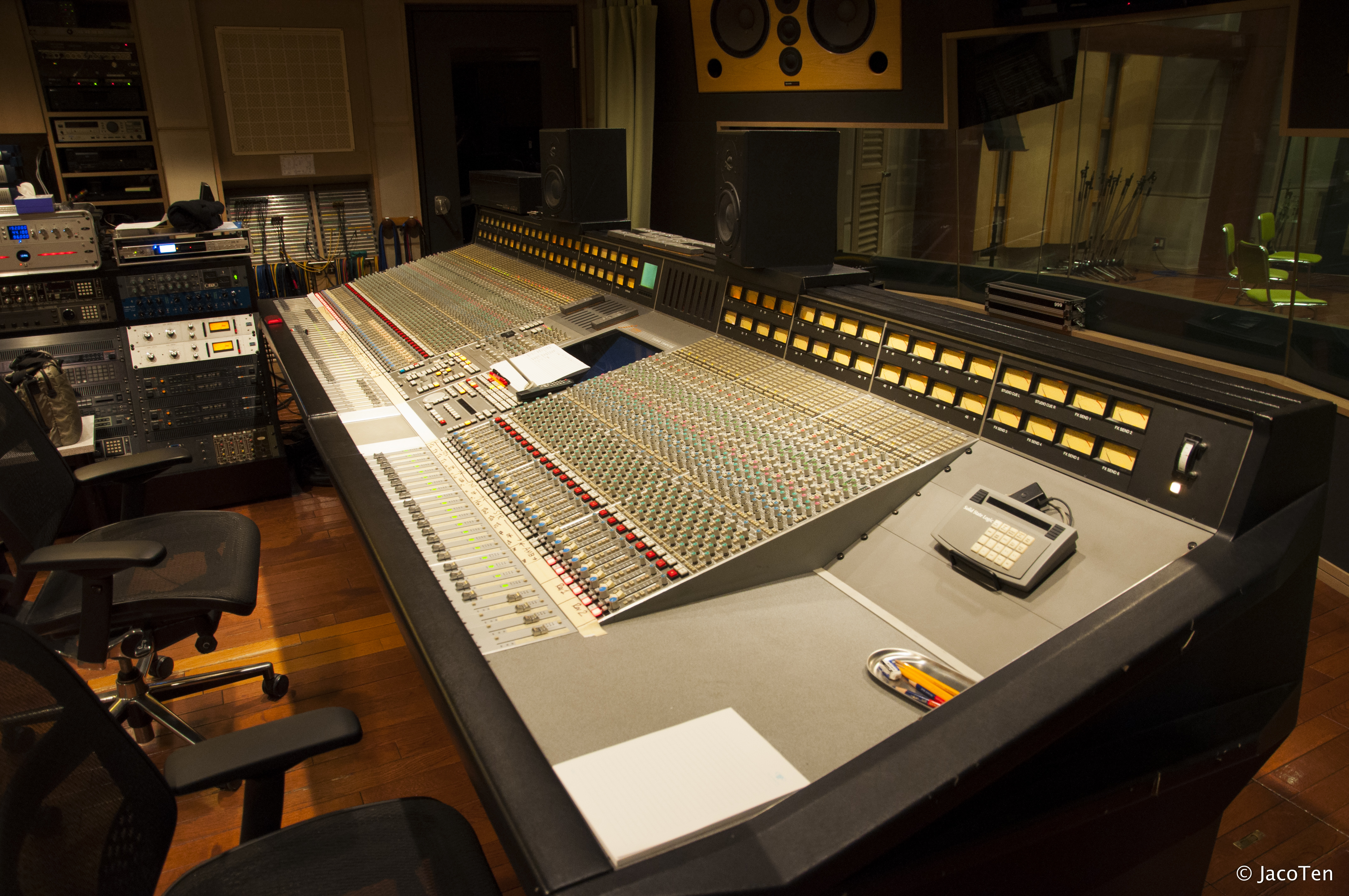
Solid State Logic SL9064J

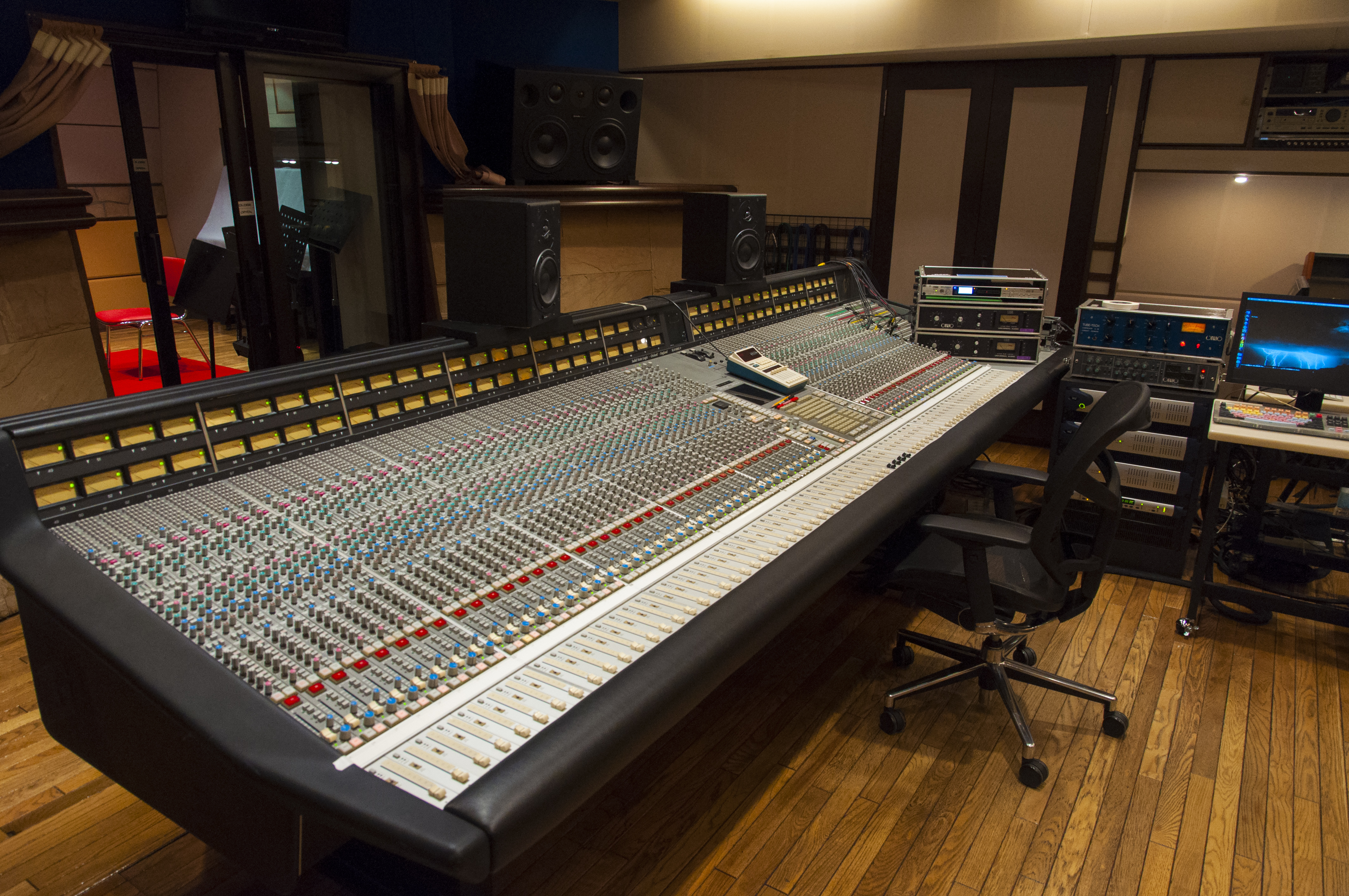
Solid State Logic SL4064G+

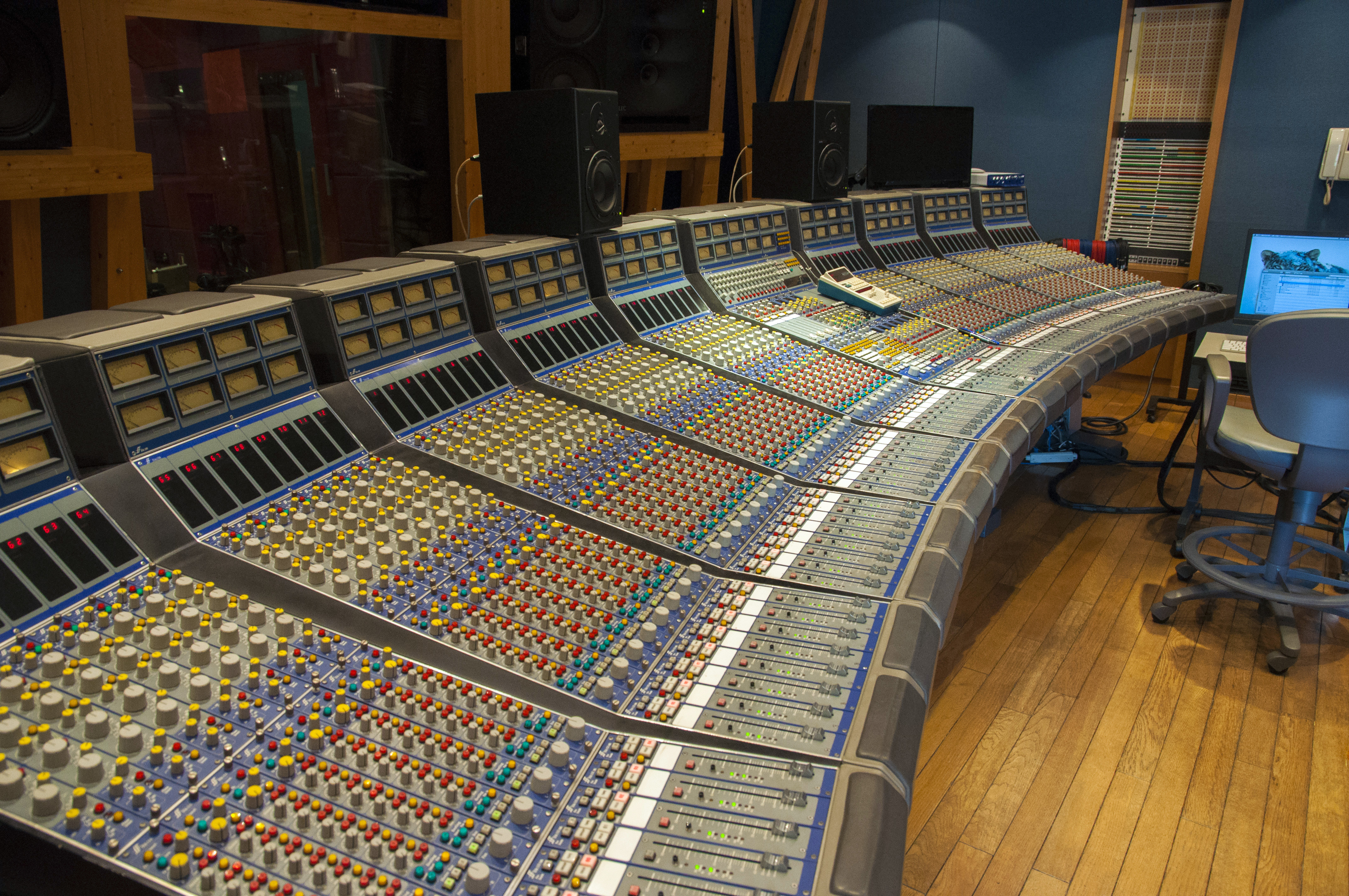
Focusrite Console 72 in 48 out with GML Fader Automation

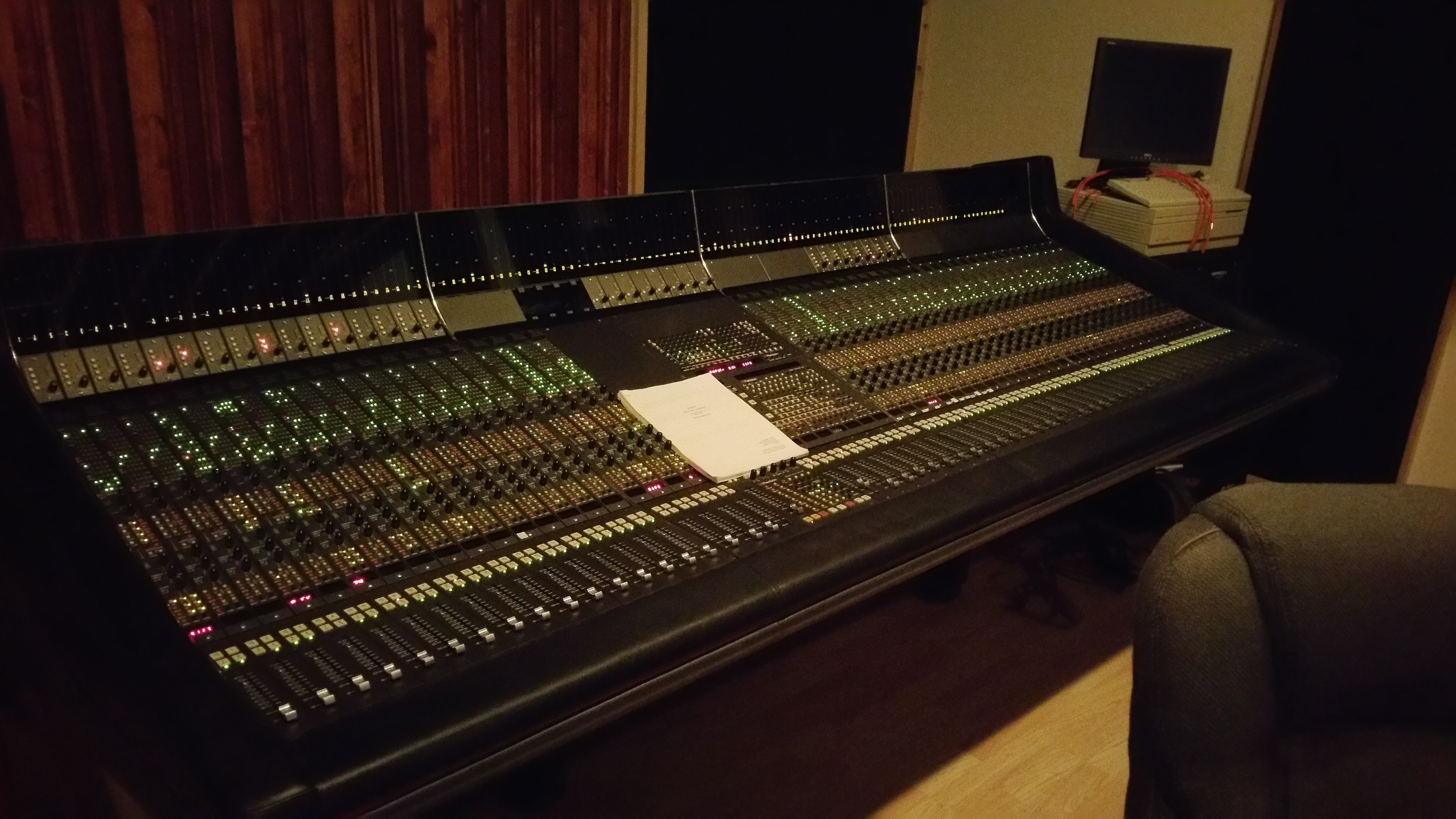
Harrison SeriesTEN

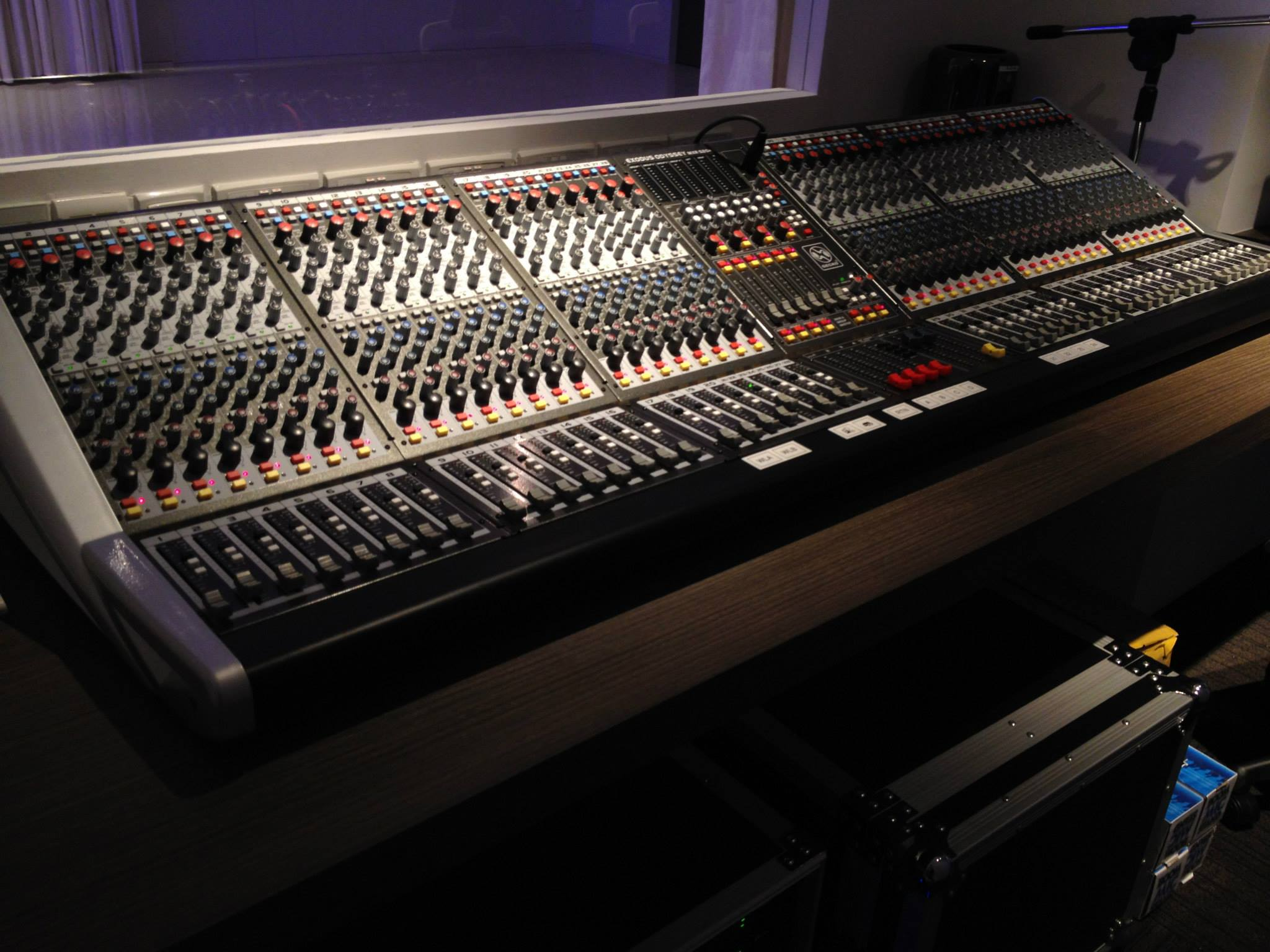
Gecko Exodus Odyssey MXR 5204L

== Notable manufacturers ==
- Alesis
- Allen & Heath
- Audient
- Automated Processes, Inc. (API)
- AMS Neve
- Avid
- Behringer
- Cadac Electronics
- Crest Audio
- DiGiCo
- Electro-Voice
- Euphonix
- Fairlight
- Focusrite
- Georg Neumann
- Harrison Audio Consoles
- Klotz Digital
- Lawo
- Mackie
- MCI
- Midas
- Peavey
- Phonic
- PreSonus
- QSC
- Rane
- Roland
- Rupert Neve Designs
- Shure
- Solid State Logic (SSL)
- Soundcraft
- Speck Electronics
- Studer
- Studiomaster
- TASCAM
- Telos Alliance
- Trident Audio
- Ward-Beck Systems
- Yamaha
- Yorkville

== See also ==
- Aux-send
- Bill Putnam
- Board mix
- Electronic mixer
- Mix automation
- Pan law
- Vision mixer – Video version of a mixing console
