= Phonic Corporation =

Taiwanese audio equipment manufacturer

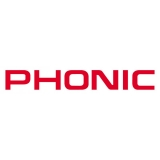
- Type: Private
- Industry: Music
- Genre: Audio equipment
- Founded: Taiwan (1977)
- Founder: Stephen Minlie Wang
- Headquarters: Taipei, Taiwan
- Number of locations: 3 (Taipei; Shanghai; Tampa, Florida)
- Area served: Worldwide
- Key people: Huiyuan Yu (Director; Finance Manager); Qihong Bai (Director; Deputy General Manager of Research and Development); Yingtai Le, Huizhen Li, Jinshu Pan, Xiande Xu (Directors)
- Products: Audio equipment
- Services: Manufacturing
- Revenue: NT$740.4 million
- Owner: Stephen M. L. Wang
- Number of employees: 598 (September 2008)
- Subsidiaries: Phonic Group, Ltd.
- Website: www.phonic.com

Phonic Corporation is a Taiwanese public company that manufactures and sells professional audio equipment, including mixing consoles, loudspeakers, studio monitors, and digital recording devices. Established in 1977, Phonic provided original equipment manufacturing to various audio companies during the 1980s. Shares of Phonic Corporation are publicly traded on the Gre Tai Securities Market.

== Products ==
=== Helix Board ===
The Helix Board series is a range of mixers produced by Phonic Corporation that provide USB or IEEE 1394 audio interfaces for digital recording with a personal computer. Phonic offers 5 different Helix Board models: Helix Board 12, Helix Board 17, Helix Board 12 FireWire MKII, Helix Board 18 FireWire MKII and the Helix Board 24 FireWire MKII. At the 2006 prolight+sound show in Frankfurt, Tastenwelt Magazine awarded Phonic with a Cordial Achievement award for innovation and excellence for their Helix Board FireWire mixers.

=== Personal Audio Assistant ===
The PAA3 is a handheld audio analyzer, with built-in microphone, for the measurement of SPL (30 to 130 dB), RT60 (up to 30 seconds) and a 31-band RTA. The PAA3 is the third generation of hand held audio analyzers from Phonic, and has been highly praised for its low price and narrow learning curve.
