= Eugene Johnson =

American virologist

Dr. Eugene "Gene" Johnson was an American virologist who specialized in filoviruses like Ebola, and Marburg. Formerly of USAMRIID, the United States Army Medical Research Institute for Infectious Disease, he was on staff at the Armed Forces Medical Intelligence Center, until his death in 2019. While at USAMRIID, Johnson coordinated the first efforts to identify the vector for Marburg virus in Kitum cave, Kenya. He also participated in the joint Centers for Disease Control and Prevention/USAMRIID containment of the 1989 Reston Ebola outbreak near Washington DC.
