= Insert (effects processing) =

Audio signal access point built into a mixing console

In audio processing and sound reinforcement, an insert is an access point built into the mixing console, allowing the audio engineer to add external line-level devices into the signal flow between the microphone preamplifier and the mix bus.

Common usages include gating, compressing, equalizing and for reverb effects that are specific to that channel or group. Inserts can be used as an alternate way to route signals, such as for multitrack recording output or line-level direct input.

== Insert jacks ==
Inserts can be balanced or unbalanced. Typically, higher-end mixers will have balanced inserts, and entry-level mixers will have unbalanced inserts. Balanced inserts appear as a pair of jacks, one serving as the send (out from the mixer) and the other serving as the return (back to the mixer). Balanced insert jacks can be XLR, 1/4" TRS phone connector or Bantam (TT).

Unbalanced inserts can also be a pair of jacks, such as RCA or 1/4-inch TS (tip sleeve) phone connector. Again, one jack serves as send, and the other serves as return.

Most modern entry-level and medium-format mixers use a single TRS phone jack for both send and return. This dual-purpose insert jack has three conductors. Because two lines share the same three-conductor insert jack, its architecture is necessarily unbalanced, with the two circuits sharing a common ground. Of the mixers using this kind of dual-purpose insert jack, most are designed with tip send, ring return. Unbalanced TRS phone inserts are often normalized. (Note: To maintain normalization with a plug inserted, cables can be wired with tip and ring connected at the insert end, and both conductors going to tip at the distant end. This allows for tapping the insert point for its signal without interrupting signal flow inside the mixer. A less reliable method to achieve the same end is to insert a TS or TRS phone plug halfway into the insert until there is a springy click feeling, at which point the plug is contacting the signal within the insert jack, but isn't breaking the normalized contact. The half-click method works fine until the insert cable is jarred or wiggled, causing noise or a loss of signal within the channel.)

Insert jacks are often normalized so that the signal is passed through the jack if nothing is inserted, but is interrupted when a plug is inserted. Inserts with two separate jacks will have normalization such that the return jack interrupts the signal, but the send jack doesn't. The send jack can always be counted on to send a signal out to an external device. A refinement of the normalization of jacks is the presence on the mixer of an insert control, which, when adjusted, allows the user to patch into or around the inserted devices at will without having to physically disconnect the insert cables.

== Mixer implementation ==
Inserts on analog mixers appear in various locations in the signal flow, depending on user configuration or the vision of the designer. Most inserts tap the signal after the microphone preamplifier and after the high-pass filter, if present. Others tap the signal after the channel EQ and before the fader. A few tap the signal after the fader and before the mix buses. Some consoles, especially digital consoles, offer a choice between possible insert points.

Digital consoles are often designed to allow the user to move the insert point to before or after the channel EQ, and some allow the insert point to be placed after the fader and before the mix buses.

Inserted devices can be connected in series to create a string of inserted devices. For instance, one could connect a gate, a compressor and an equalizer in series through the same channel's insert.

Some digital mixers allow multiple internal effects to be inserted virtually; still others allow one or more third-party plugins to be inserted.

Inserts might be found on monoaural mixer inputs, monoaural and stereo subgroups, auxiliary inputs, main outputs and matrix outputs, but are rarely found on stereo line-level inputs. EQs are commonly inserted on monitor mixer output mixes so that the monitor engineer can use his own monitor wedge and the pre-fade listen bus to hear what the artist's wedge sounds like without having to climb on stage to check.

== Signal levels ==
Similar to line-level inputs and outputs, insert points are found at a variety of signal levels. Most are designed to handle a nominal -10 dBV consumer line level or +4 dBu professional line level, although variations may be found. Most balanced inserts are at +4 dBu nominal level. Both analog and digital designs include sufficient headroom to allow transients exceeding the nominal level to be handled without distortion. For example, a digital console's inserts might be designed such that a +4 dBu signal corresponds to a -20 dBFS digital representation, effectively yielding 20 dB of headroom. For optimal gain staging and the least amount of system hiss, inserted devices should be chosen with regard to the signal levels both they and the mixer can handle, the ideal gain staging being achieved when the levels of both the insert and inserted device match.

== See also ==
- Patch bay
