= Index of electronics articles =

This is an index of articles relating to electronics and electricity or natural electricity and things that run on electricity and things that use or conduct electricity.

== 0–9 ==
16VSB – 2VSB – 32VSB – 4000 series – 4VSB – 555 timer IC – 7400 series – 8VSB

== A ==
Absolute gain (physics) – Access control – Access time – Acoustic coupler – Adaptive communications – Adder – Adjacent-channel interference – Alarm sensor – Aliasing – Allied Electronics – Alternating current – AM radio – Amateur radio – Ambient noise level – American Radio Relay League (ARRL) – Ammeter – Ampere – Amplifier – Amplitude distortion – Amplitude modulation – Analog computer – Analog – Analog-to-digital converter – Analogue switch – Analysis of resistive circuits – Angular misalignment loss – Antenna – Antenna aperture – Antenna blind cone – Antenna gain – Antenna height above average terrain – Antenna noise temperature – Antenna theory – Aperture (antenna) – Aperture-to-medium coupling loss – Apollo Guidance Computer – Arithmetic and logical unit – Armstrong oscillator – ARRL – Articulation score – Astable – Asymmetric Digital Subscriber Line – Asynchronous communications system – Asynchronous operation – Asynchronous start-stop – Atmospheric duct – Atmospheric waveguide – Attenuation – Audible ringing tone – Audio system measurements – Audiophile – Automatic call distributor – Automatic gain control – Automatic link establishment – Automatic number identification – Automatic sounding – Automatic switching system – Autovon – Availability – Avalanche diode – Azimuth

== B ==
Backplane – Backscattering – Back-to-back connection – Backward channel – Balance return loss – Balanced line – Balancing network – Ball grid array – Band gap – Band-stop filter – Bandwidth compression – Bare particular – Barrage jamming – Baseband – Battery (electricity) – Baud – Baudot code – BCS theory – Beam diameter – Beam divergence – Beam steering – Beamwidth – Beat frequency oscillator – Bel – Biconical antenna – Big ugly dish – Bilateral synchronization – Billboard antenna – Binary classification – Binary multiplier – Binaural recording – Bipolar junction transistor – Bipolar signal – Bit inversion – Bit pairing – Bit robbing – Bit stuffing – Bit synchronous operation – Bit-count integrity – Bits per second – Black facsimile transmission – Black recording – Blanketing – Bluetooth – Blu-ray Disc – BNC connector – Boresight – Breadboard – Bremsstrahlung – Bridging loss – Broadband Internet – Broadband wireless access – Broadband – Broadcasting – Burst transmission – Busy hour – Busy signal – Bypass

== C ==
Cable modem – Cable television – Caesium standard – Call collision – Call set-up time – Call-second – Capacitive coupling – Capacitor – Capture effect – Carbon nanotube – Card standards – Carrier-sense multiple access with collision detection – Carrier shift – Carrier system – Carrier wave – Carrier-to-receiver noise density – Carson bandwidth rule – Cassegrain antenna – Category 5 cable – Cathode-ray tube – Central processing unit – Chadless tape – Channel – Channel noise level – Channel reliability – Character-count integrity – Characteristic impedance – Charge-coupled device – Chemical vapor deposition – Chirp – Chroma subsampling – Circuit breaker – Circuit noise level – Circuit reliability – Circuit restoration – Circuit switching – Circular polarization – Circulator – Citizens' band radio – Cladding – Clapp oscillator – Clean room – Clear channel – Clearing – Clipping – Clock gating – Clock signal – Closed waveguide – Closed-circuit television – CMOS – Coaxial cable – Co-channel interference – Code-division multiple access – Code word – Coherence length – Coherence time – Coherence – Coherent differential phase-shift keying – Coherer – Coilgun – Collinear antenna array – Collinear antenna array – Collins Radio – Colpitts oscillator – Combat-net radio – Combinational logic – Combined distribution frame – Common base – Common battery – Common collector – Common control – Common emitter – Commonality – Common-mode interference – Communications center – Communications satellite – Communications security – Communications system engineering – Communications system – Communications-electronics – Compact audio cassette – Compatible sideband transmission – Composite image filter – Composite video – Compulsator – Computer – Concentrator – Conditioning equipment – Conducted interference – Conduction band – Conductive coupling – Connections per circuit hour – Conservation of radiance – Constant k filter – Content delivery – Contention – Continuous Fourier transform – Continuous operation – Continuous wave – Convolution – Copper – Cord circuit – Corner reflector – Cosmic noise – Costas loop – Coulomb's law – Counter (digital) – Coupling – Covert channel – Covert listening device – CPU design – CQD – C-QUAM – Critical frequency – Cross product – Crossbar switch – Crosstalk – Crystal filter – Crystal radio receiver – Current – Current bias – Current-to-voltage converter – Cutback technique – Cutoff frequency – Cutoff wavelength

== D ==
D region – D-4 – Data bank – Data circuit terminating equipment – Data compaction – Data integrity – Data link – Data service unit – Data terminal equipment – Data transmission circuit – Data – Datasheet – dBa – dBm – DBrn – DDR SDRAM – Degree of isochronous distortion – Delay line – Delta modulation – Demand assignment – Demand factor – Demand load – Demodulation – Demodulator – Departure angle – Design objective – Despun antenna – Deviation – Dial-up – Diamagnetism – Dielectric constant – Dielectric strength – Dielectric waveguide – Dielectric – Differential amplifier – Diffraction – Digital access and cross-connect system – Digital Audio Tape – Digital circuit – Digital filter – Digital multiplex hierarchy – Digital radio – Digital signal processing – Digital signal processor – Digital-to-analog converter – Digital transmission group – Digitizer – DIN – Diode – DIP switch – Dipole antenna – Dipole – Direct bandgap – Direct broadcast satellite – Direct current – Direct distance dialing – Direct ray – Directional antenna – Directional coupler – Directive gain – Direct-sequence spread spectrum – Discrete Fourier transform – Discrete – Dispersion-limited operation – Display device – Distortion – Distortion-limited operation – Emergency locator beacon – Distributed switching – Diurnal phase shift – Diversity reception – DOD master clock – Doping – Double-sideband suppressed-carrier transmission – Double-slit experiment – Drift – Drop and insert – Dropout – Dual access – Dual impedance – Dual in-line package – Dual-modulus prescaler – Dual-tone multi-frequency – Duobinary signal – Duplex – Duty cycle – DXCC – Dynamic range

== E ==
Earphone – Earpiece – Earth's magnetic field – EDIF – EEPROM – Effective antenna gain contour – Effective boresight area – Effective data transfer rate – Effective Earth radius – Effective height – Effective input noise temperature – Effective isotropically radiated power – Effective monopole radiated power – Effective radiated power – Effective transmission rate – Efficiency factor – E-layer – Electric charge – Electric current – Electric field – Electric motor – Electric power transmission – Electric power – Electrical conduction – Electrical conductivity – Electrical connector – Electrical efficiency – Element – Electrical engineering – Electrical generator – Impedance – Insulation – Electrical length – Load – Electrical network – Circuit – Electrical resistance – Electrical room – Electrical signal – Electricity distribution – Electricity – Electrochemical cell – Electrochemistry – Electrode – Electrodynamics – Electrolytic capacitor – Electromagnetic environment – Electromagnetic induction – Electromagnetic interference control – Electromagnetic pulse – Electromagnetic radiation and health – Electromagnetic radiation – Electromagnetic spectrum – Electromagnetic survivability – Electromagnetism – Electrometer – Electron hole – Electron – Electronic amplifier – Electronic color code – Color code – Electronic data processing – Electronic deception – Electronic design automation – Electronic filter – Electronic imager – Electronic mixer – Electronic musical instrument – Electronic oscillator – Electronic power supply – Electronic switching system – Electronic tagging – Electronic test equipment – Electronic warfare support measures – Electronics – Electro-optic effect – Electro-optic modulator – Electro-optics – Electrostatic discharge – Electrostatics – Emergency Locator Transmitter – Emergency Position-Indicating Radio Beacon – Emitter coupled logic – End distortion – Endurability – Enhanced service – Entropy encoding – Equilibrium length – Equivalent impedance transforms – Equivalent noise resistance – Equivalent pulse code modulation noise – Error burst – Error ratio – Error-correcting code – E-skip – Examples of electrical phenomena – Extremely Low Frequency (ELF) – Eye pattern

== F ==
Fab (semiconductors) – Semiconductor device fabrication – Facsimile converter – Fading – Fading distribution – Fail safe – Fall time – Fan-beam antenna – Farad – Faraday cage – Faraday constant – Faraday's law of induction – Far-field region – Fault – Fault management – FCC registration program – Federal Standard 1037C – Feed horn – Feedback – Ferroelectric effect – Ferromagnetism – Field (physics) – Field – Field effect transistor – Field strength – FPGA Field programmable gate array – Filled cable – Filter design – Filter (signal processing) – Flip-flop – Fluorescent lamp – Flutter – Flux – Flywheel effect – FM band – FM improvement factor – FM improvement threshold – FM radio – Forward error correction – Fourier series – Fourier transform (see also List of Fourier-related transforms) – Four-wire circuit – Four-wire terminating set – Fractal antenna – Frame – Frame rate – Frame slip – Frame synchronization – Framing bit – Freenet – Free-space loss – Freeze frame television – Frequency assignment – Frequency averaging – Frequency counter – Frequency deviation – Frequency frogging – Frequency modulation synthesis – Frequency modulation – Frequency standard – Frequency synthesiser – Frequency – Frequency-division multiplexing – Frequency-exchange signaling – Frequency-hopping spread spectrum – Frequency-shift keying – Fresnel equations – Fresnel reflection – Fresnel zone – Front-to-back ratio – Fuel cell – Fuse (electrical)

== G ==
Gallium arsenide – Galvanic isolation – Galvanometer – Gateway – Gating – Gauss – Geiger–Müller tube – Gel electrophoresis – Gemini Guidance Computer – Gender changer – Global Positioning System – Global system for mobile communications – GNU Radio – Grade of service – Graded-index fiber – Ground constants – Ground loop – Ground plane – Ground (electricity) – Groundwave – Guided ray – Gyrator

== H ==
Halftone characteristic – Hall effect – Hamming code – Hamming distance – Handoff – Handshake (computing) – Hard copy – Hardware register – Harmonic analysis – Harmonic oscillator – Harmonic – Hartley oscillator – H-channel – Heat sink – Helical antenna – Helmholtz coil – Henry (unit) – Hertz – Heterodyne repeater – Heterodyne – High frequency – High-performance equipment – High-speed circuit-switched data – Hop – Horn – Hot-point probe – Hybrid balance – Hybrid circuit – Hybrid coil – Hybrid coupler – Hysteresis

== I ==
IEEE 315-1975 – IEEE 802.11 – IEEE 802.15 – IEEE 802 – Image antenna – Image impedance – Image frequency – Image rejection ratio – Image response – Impedance matching – In-band on-channel – Incidental radiator – Independent sideband – Index of cooperation – Inductive coupling – Inductive reactance – Inductor – Industrial Computers – Information transfer – Information-bearer channel – Infrared – Input/output – Insertion gain – Insertion loss – Inside plant – Integrated circuit – Intensity modulation – Intentional radiator – Intercept – Interchange circuit – Intercharacter interval – Interconnect facility – Interference – Interferometry – Intermediate-field region – Intermodulation distortion – International Electrotechnical Commission – Interoperability – Interposition trunk – Intersymbol interference – Inverse multiplexer – Inverse-square law – Ion pump – Ionosphere – ISM band – Isochronous burst transmission – Isochronous signal – Isotropic antenna

== J ==
Jam signal – Jamming – Jansky – Jitter

== K ==
Karnaugh map – Kendall effect – Key pulsing – Kirchhoff's circuit laws – Klystron – Knife-edge effect

== L ==
Laser – Launch angle – Launch numerical aperture – Lead-lag effect – Leaky mode – Light bulb – Light-dependent resistor – Light-emitting diode – Lightning – Limiting – Line code – Linear-feedback shift register – Linear regulator – Lip synchronization – List of telephony terminology – Lists of video game companies – LM741 – Low-noise amplifier – Loading characteristic – Loading coil – Lobe – Local battery – Logic families – Logic gate – Logic – Log-periodic antenna – Long-haul communications – Longitudinal redundancy check – Long-tailed pair – Long-term stability – Loop – Loop gain – Loop-back – Low frequency – Low-performance equipment – Lumped element model

== M ==
Macroelectronics – Magnet – Magnetic-core memory – Magnetic field – Magnetic flux quantum – Magnetic flux – Magnetic levitation – Magnetism – Magneto-optic effect – Magnetosphere – Magnetron – Main distribution frame – Main lobe – Manchester code – Maser – Mask work – Master frequency generator – Maximal-ratio combiner – Maximum power – Maximum usable frequency – Maxwell coil – Maxwell's demon – Maxwell's equations – m-derived filter – Mean time between outages – Mediation function – Medium frequency (MF) – Medium-power talker – Medium wave – Metal – Michelson–Morley experiment – Microelectronics – Microphone – Microwave auditory effect – Microwave oven – Microwave – MIL-STD-188 – Minimum bend radius – Mode scrambler – Mode volume – Modem – Modular synthesizer – Modulation factor – Modulation rate – Modulation – Molecular electronics – Monostable – Moore's law – Morse code – MOS Technology 6501 – MOS Technology 6502 – MOS Technology SID – MOS Technology VIC-II – Mu-law algorithm – Multicoupler – Multi-element dipole antenna – Multimeter – Multipath propagation – Multiple access – Multiple homing – Multiplex baseband – Multiplexer – Multiplexing – Multivibrator

== N ==
N connector – Nanotechnology – Nanowire – Narrative traffic – Narrowband modem – Narrowband – National Electrical Code (US) – Natural frequency – Near-field region – Negative resistance – Negative-acknowledge character – Net gain (telecommunications) – Netlist – Network administration – Network architecture – Network management – Neural network (machine learning) – Neutral direct-current telegraph system – NI Multisim – Nickel metal hydride – Noise figure – Noise (electronics) – Noise power – Noise temperature – Noise weighting – Noise-cancelling headphone – Noise-equivalent power – Non-return-to-zero – Normalized frequency – Norton's theorem – NTSC – Nuclear electromagnetic pulse – Nuclear magnetic resonance – Null (radio) – Numbers station – Numerical aperture – Numerically controlled oscillator – Nyquist interval

== O ==
Off-hook – Off-line – Ohm (unit) – Ohmmeter – Ohm's law – Oliver Heaviside – Omnidirectional antenna – One-way trunk – On-hook – On-line – Open circuit – Open spectrum – Operational amplifier – Optical density – Optical fiber – Optical path length – Optical spectrum – Optoelectronic – Orthogonal frequency division modulation – Orthomode transducer – Oscilloscope – Out-of-band signaling – Outside plant – Overflow – Overhead information – Overmodulation – Override – Overshoot (signal)

== P ==
Packet switching – Packet-switching node – Paired disparity code – PAL – Par meter – Parabolic antenna – Parabolic microphone – Parallel transmission – Parasitic element (electrical networks) – Parity bit – Passband – Passive radiator – Patch bay – Path loss – Path profile – Pauli exclusion principle – PBER – PCB layout guidelines – Peak envelope power – Peltier effect – Performance measurement period – Periodic antenna – Periscope antenna – Permeability – Permittivity – Personal Locator Beacon – Phantom circuit – Phantom loop – Phase – Phase distortion – Phase jitter – Phase modulation – Phase noise – Phase perturbation – Phased array – Phase-locked loop – Phase-shift keying – Philberth-Transformer – Phone connector (audio) – Photodiode – Photoelectric effect – Photolithography – Photon – Physical layer – Pickup – PID controller – Piezoelectricity – Pin grid array – Pirate radio – Planar array – Planck constant – Plesiochronous Digital Hierarchy – Point-to-point construction – Polarential telegraph system – Polarization – Polling – Polyphase system – Portable people meter – Potential difference – Potential divider – Power – Power connector – Power supply – Preamplifier – Preemphasis network – Preemphasis – Preferred values – Preventive maintenance – Primary channel – Primary line constants – Primary time standard – Principal clock – Printed circuit board – Processor register – Product detector – Programmable logic device – Propagation delay – Propagation mode – Propagation path obstruction – Propagation of schema – Proration – Pseudorandom noise – Pseudorandom number sequence – PSK31 – Pulse amplitude – Pulse duration – Pulse – Pulse-address multiple access – Pulse-code modulation – Pulsed inductive thruster – Pulse-width modulation – Push-to-talk operation – Push-to-type operation – Pyroelectricity

== Q ==
Q code – QRP operation – Q-switching – Quadrature amplitude modulation – Quadrature – Quality assurance – Quality control – Quantum harmonic oscillator – Quartz clock – Quasi-analog signal – Queuing delay

== R ==
Race hazard – Radar – Radiation angle – Radiation mode – Radiation pattern – Radiation resistance – Radiator – Radio beam – Radio clock – Radio electronics – Radio frequency induction – Radio frequency – Radio horizon range – Radio horizon – Radio propagation – Radio range – Radio Row, Manhattan – Radio station – Radio – RadioShack – Radiotelephone – Radioteletype – Radix-64 – Railgun – Random-access memory – Ray transfer matrix analysis – RC circuit – RC – RCA jack – RCA – Reactance – Receive-after-transmit time delay – Received noise power – Receiver – Receiver attack-time delay – Reconnaissance satellite – Record medium – Reference antenna – Reference circuit – Reference clock – Reference noise – Reference surface – Reflection coefficient – Reflections of signals on conducting lines – Reflective array antenna – Refractive index contrast – Regenerative circuit – Register transfer level – Registered jack – Relational model – Relative transmission level – Relaxation oscillator – Relay – Release time – Remote Operations Service Element protocol – Remote sensing – Repair and maintenance – Repeater – Repeating coil – Reproduction speed – Reradiation – Resistor color code – Resistor – Resonance – Response time – Responsivity – Return loss – RF connector – RF modulator – RF power margin – RF probe – RF shielding – RFID – RGB color space – Rhombic antenna – Ring current – Ring latency – Ring modulation – Ringback signal – Ringdown –

RL circuit – RLC circuit – Robot – Rogowski coil – Root mean square – Routing indicator – RS-232 – RX – Rydberg formula

== S ==
S/PDIF – Sacrificial anode – Sampling frequency – Scalar field – Scanner – Scanning electron microscope – SCART – Schematic – Schumann resonance – Scrambler – SECAM – Second audio program – Second-order intercept point – Security management – Self-clocking signal – Self-synchronizing code – Semiautomatic switching system – Semiconductor device – Semiconductor – Sensitivity – Sensor Networks – Separate channel signaling – Serial access – Serial ATA – Serial Peripheral Interface Bus – Serial transmission – Series and parallel circuits – Shadow loss – Shannon limit – Shannon's theorem – Short circuit – Shortwave – Shot noise – Shrinking generator – Side lobe – Sideband – Sidereal time – Siemens – Signal (information theory) – Signal compression – Signal processing gain – Signal processing – Signal reflection – Signal transition – Signal-to-crosstalk ratio – Signal-to-noise ratio – Signature block – Significant condition – Silicon bandgap temperature sensor – Silicon – Simplex circuit – Simplex signaling – Sinc filter – Single frequency networks – Single-phase electric power – Single-frequency signaling – Single-polarized antenna – Single-sideband modulation – Skew (antenna) – Skin effect – Skip zone – Skywave – Slant range – Slewing – Slew rate – Slot antenna – Slow-scan television – Software-defined radio – Solar cell – Soldering – Solenoid – Sound card – Space diversity – Space tether – Spark gap – Specific detectivity – Specification – Speckle pattern – Spectral width – Spectrum – Spectrum analyzer – Speed of light – Speed of service – SPICE – Spill-forward feature – Spillover – Spin glass – Spot beam – Spread spectrum – Spurious emission – Squelch – Standard telegraph level – Standard test signal – Standard test tone – Standing wave ratio – Standing wave – Starpath Supercharger – Start signal – Start-stop transmission – Static electricity – Steady-state condition – Step-index profile – Stoletov's law – Stop signal – Stopband – Store-and-forward switching center – Stressed environment – Strobe light – Stroke speed – Subcarrier – Subtractive synthesis – Sudden ionospheric disturbance – Supercomputer – Superconductivity – Superheterodyne receiver – Superparamagnetism – Superposition theorem – Superregenerative receiver– Supervisory program – Suppressed carrier transmission – Surface wave – Surface-mount technology – Surveillance device – Survivability – S-Video – Switch – Switched-mode power supply – Synchronism – Synchronization – Synchronizing – Synchronous network – Synchronous optical networking – Synthesizer – System integrity – Systems control

== T ==
Table of standard electrode potentials – Tactical communications system – Tactical communications – Tactical data information link--A – Tantalum – Tape relay – T-carrier – Technical control facility – Telecommunications – Communications – Telecommunications service – Teleconference – Telegrapher's equations – Telegraphy – Telemetry – Telephone tapping – Teletext – Teletraining – Television – Television reception – TEMPEST – Tensor – Tesla coil – Tesla patents – Test antenna – Tether propulsion – Thermal noise – Thermal tails – Thermistor – Thévenin's theorem – Third-order intercept point – TNC connector – Three phase – Time-assignment speech interpolation – Time-division multiple access – Time-division multiplexing – Time-domain reflectometer – Time-out – Tinfoil hat – Toll switching trunk – Total harmonic distortion – Total internal reflection – Traffic intensity – Traffic shaping – Transceiver – Transcoding – Transducer – Transformer – Transient electromagnetic device – Transimpedance amplifier – Transistor radio – Transistor – Transistor-transistor logic – TTL – Transition metal – Transmission coefficient – Transmission level point – Transmission line – Transmission medium – Medium – Transmit-after-receive time delay – Transmitter attack-time delay – Transmitter – Transmitter-studio link – Transparent latch – Transponder – Transverse redundancy check – Traveling-wave tube – TRF – Triangle wave – Trimline telephone – Troposphere – Tropospheric ducting – Tropospheric wave – Tube characteristics– Tube curves– Tuner – Twisted pair – TX

== U ==
Ultra high frequency – Ultra Wideband – Ultraviolet – Unavailability – Uncertainty principle – Uniform linear array – Unijunction transistor – Unintentional radiator – Uplink – Upright position (electronics) – User (telecommunications)

== V ==
VAC – Vačkář oscillator – Vacuum tube – Valence band – Valve curves– Variable length buffer – Varicap – Varistor – VDC – Vector field – Veroboard – Very high frequency – Very-large-scale integration – VHDL – Video cassette recorder – Video Game Console – Video Game – Video teleconference – Video teleconferencing unit – Video – Vienna rectifier – Vintage amateur radio – Virtual circuit capability – Virtual circuit – Virtual ground – Voice frequency primary patch bay – Voice frequency – Volt- Voltage bias – Voltage-to-current converter – Voltmeter – Vox

== W ==
Wardenclyffe Tower – Warner exemption – Warsaw rectifier – Watt – Wave impedance – Wave propagation – Wave – Waveform – Waveguide antenna – Waveguide – Wavelength division multiplexing – Wavelength – Wheatstone bridge – Whip antenna – White facsimile transmission – Wideband modem – Williams tube – Wink pulsing – Wire wrap – Wire – Wireless access point – Wireless community network – Wireless network – Wireless personal area network – Wireless – X-dimension of recorded spot – XLR connector

== Y ==
Yagi antenna – Y-delta transform – YUV

== Z ==
Zero dBm transmission level point – Zero insertion force (ZIF) – Zero-dispersion wavelength – Zigbee – Zig-zag in-line package – Zobel network – Zone melting – Z-transform

== See also ==
- List of military electronics of the United States
