= Backward channel =

In a data transmission circuit a backward channel is the channel that passes data in a direction opposite to that of its associated forward channel. The backward channel is usually used for transmission of request, supervisory, acknowledgement, or error-control signals. The direction of flow of these signals is opposite to that in which user information is being transferred. The backward-channel bandwidth is usually less than that of the primary channel, that is, the forward (user information) channel. For example, ADSL's upstream channel, considered a backward channel for some types of analysis, typically has a bandwidth less than one-fourth of the downstream channel.

In data transmission, it is a secondary channel in which the direction of transmission is constrained to be opposite to that of the primary, i.e., the forward (user-information) channel. The direction of transmission in the backward channel is restricted by the control interchange circuit that controls the direction of transmission in the primary channel.

== See also ==
- Return channel
