= Dispersion-limited operation =

A dispersion-limited operation is an operation of a communications link in which signal waveform degradation attributable to the dispersive effects of the communications medium is the dominant mechanism that limits link performance. The dispersion is the filter-like effect which a link has on the signal, due to the different propagation speeds of the eigenmodes of the link. Practically, this means that the waveform at the input will be different from the waveform at the output of the link.

Note that the amount of allowable degradation is dependent on the quality of the receiver. In fiber optic communications, dispersion-limited operation is often confused with distortion-limited operation.
