= Carrier shift =

Telecommunications term

In telecommunications, the term carrier shift has the following meanings:

1. In the transmission of binary or teletypewriter signals, keying in which the frequency of the carrier signal is shifted in one direction for marking signals and in the opposite direction for spacing signals.
2. In amplitude modulation, a condition that results from imperfect modulation in which the positive and negative excursions of the modulating envelope are unequal in amplitude.

Note 1: The carrier shift results in a change in carrier power.

Note 2: The carrier shift may be a shift to a higher or to a lower frequency.

This article incorporates public domain material from Federal Standard 1037C. General Services Administration. Archived from the original on 2022-01-22. (in support of MIL-STD-188).
