= Systems control =

Systems control, in a communications system, is the control and implementation of a set of functions that:

1. prevent or eliminate degradation of any part of the system,
2. initiate immediate response to demands that are placed on the system,
3. respond to changes in the system to meet long range requirements, and
4. may include various subfunctions, such as
  - immediate circuit utilization actions,
  - continuous control of circuit quality,
  - continuous control of equipment performance,
  - development of procedures for immediate repair, restoration, or replacement of facilities and equipment,
  - continuous liaison with system users and with representatives of other systems, and
  - the provision of advice and assistance in system use.
