= Dual access =

In telecommunications, the term dual access has the following meanings:

1. The connection of a user to two switching centers by separate access lines using a single message routing indicator or telephone number.
2. In satellite communications, the transmission of two carriers simultaneously through a single communication satellite repeater.

Also, network hardware company D-Link has named technology which allows two simultaneous connections over one cable, for example 1) Internet and 2) provider's local FTP or game servers or IPTV data flow.
