= Voice frequency primary patch bay =

Patching facility

In telecommunications, a voice frequency primary patch bay (VF) is a patching facility that provides the first appearance of local-user VF circuits in the technical control facility (TCF).

The VF primary patch bay provides patching, monitoring, and testing for all VF circuits. Signals will have various levels and signaling schemes depending on the user terminal equipment.
