= Window of opportunity =

Period of time

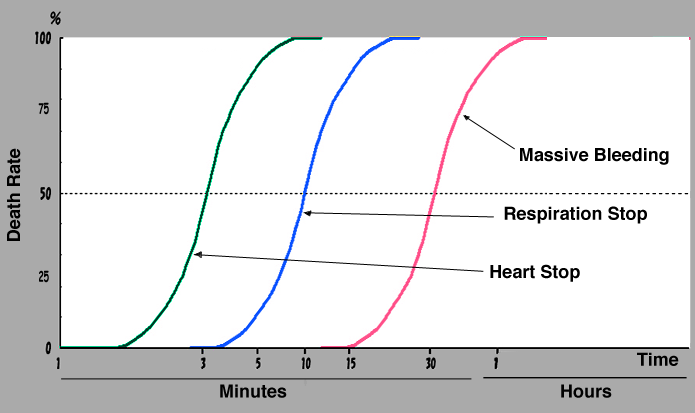
Critical windows in emergency medicine

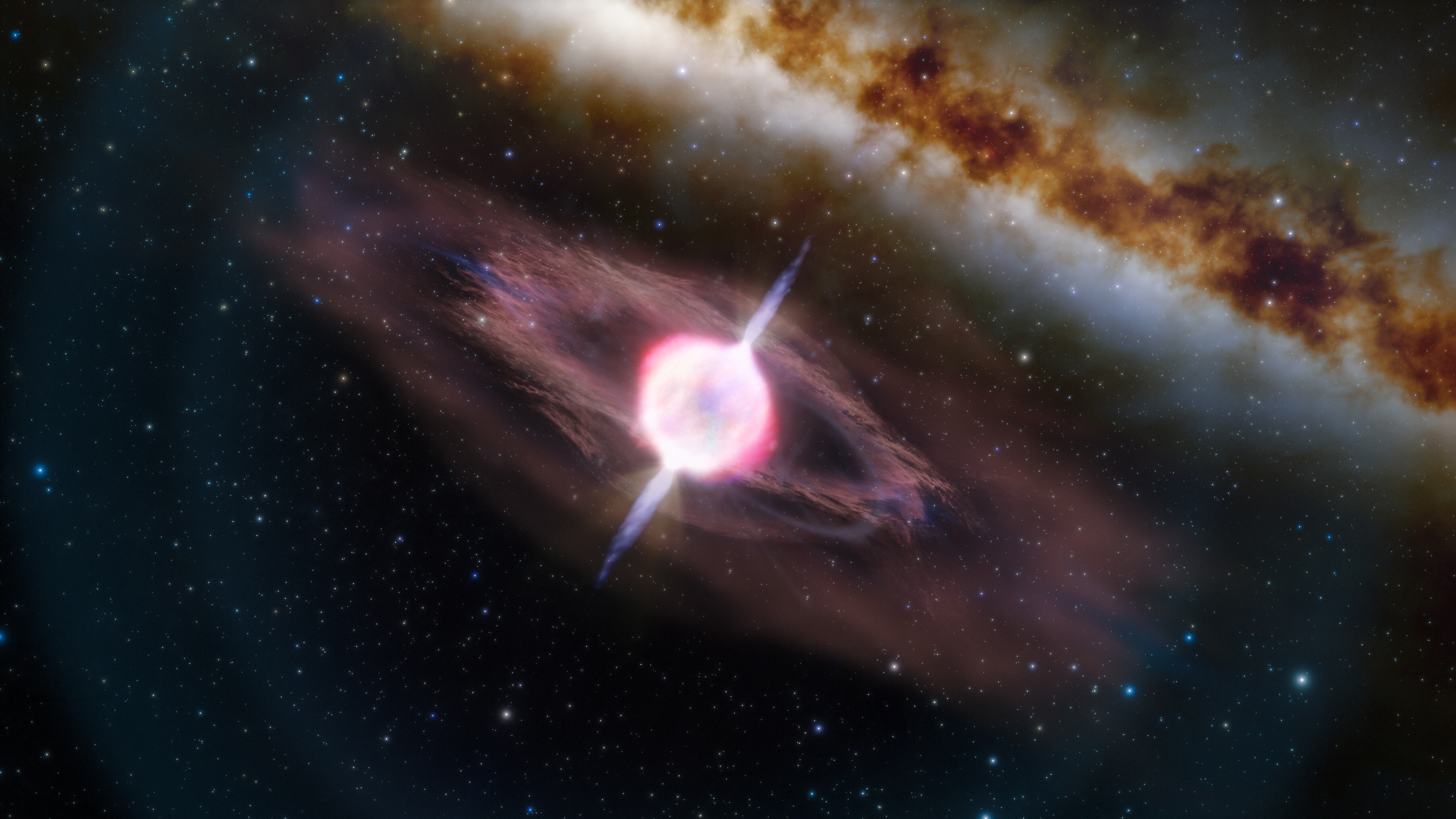
Illustration of a short gamma-ray burst, a transient astronomical event caused by a collapsing star

A window of opportunity, also called a margin of opportunity or critical window, is a period of time during which some action can be taken that will achieve a desired outcome. Once this period is over, or the "window is closed", the specified outcome is no longer possible.

== Examples ==
Windows of opportunity include:

=== Biology and medicine ===
- The critical period in neurological development, during which neuroplasticity is greatest and key functions, such as imprinting and language, are acquired which may be impossible to acquire at a later stage
- The golden hour or golden time, used in emergency medicine to describe the period following traumatic injury in which life-saving treatment is most likely to be successful

=== Economics ===
- Market opportunities, in which one may be positioned to take advantage of a gap in a particular market, the timing of which may depend on the activities of customers, competitors, and other market context factors
- Limited time offer, a critical window for consumers that is artificially imposed (or even falsely implied) as a marketing tactic to encourage action

=== Other examples ===
- Planting and harvesting seasons, in agriculture, which are generally timed to maximize crop yields
- Space launch and maneuver windows, which are determined by orbital dynamics and mission goals and constrained by fuel/delta-v budgets
- Theorized tipping points in climatology, after which the Earth's climate is predicted to shift to a new stable equilibrium
- Transient astronomical events, which present limited (and often unpredictable) windows for observation

== Characteristics ==
=== Timing ===
The timing and length of a critical window may be well known and predictable (as in planetary transits) or more poorly understood (as in medical emergencies or climate change). In some cases, there may be multiple windows during which a goal can be achieved, as in the case of space launch windows.

In situations with very brief or unpredictable windows of opportunity, automation may be employed to take advantage of these windows, as in automated processing of financial transactions and time-domain astronomy. Real-time computing systems can guarantee responses on the order of milliseconds or less.

=== Costs ===
In some time-critical situations, there may not be a particular instant at which a desired outcome becomes impossible, but rather, failure to act may entail an increasing cost over time, or a decreasing probability over time of achieving the desired outcome. In real-time computing systems, this may be represented by time-utility functions.

== See also ==
- Planning
  - Automated planning and scheduling, in artificial intelligence
- Point of no return
- Response time
- Target of opportunity, in combat
- Time limit
