= Call gapping =

Telephone load controlling method

Call gapping is a load control method for restricting telephone traffic on a telephone network to particular destinations. It is used to protect switches against call processing overload. There are a number of algorithms available to achieve this.

- Crawford gapping works by blocking calls for a determined period of time (the gap size). After the period of time passes, another call is allowed through. Another gap is then started and the process repeats until the overload condition is resolved.
- Leaky Bucket gapping creates a queue into which new call attempts are placed. Calls are handled from this queue at a pre-defined rate. Any new calls arriving at a full queue are rejected.
- Proportional Bidding rejects a pre-defined percentage of call attempts.

For a rejected call, an announcement may be played.

== See also ==
- Silence suppression
