= Frequency-division multiple access =

Signal processing technique in telecommunications

Frequency-division multiple access (FDMA) is a channel access method used in some multiple-access protocols. FDMA allows multiple users to send data through a single communication channel, such as a coaxial cable or microwave beam, by dividing the bandwidth of the channel into separate non-overlapping frequency sub-channels and allocating each sub-channel to a separate user. Users can send data through a subchannel by modulating it on a carrier wave at the subchannel's frequency. It is used in satellite communication systems and telephone trunklines.

FDMA splits the total bandwidth into multiple channels. Each ground station on the earth is allocated a particular frequency group (or a range of frequencies). Within each group, the ground station can allocate different frequencies to individual channels, which are used by different stations connected to that ground station. Before the transmission begins, the transmitting ground station looks for an empty channel within the frequency range that is allocated to it and once it finds an empty channel, it allocates it to the particular transmitting station.

== Method ==
Alternatives include time-division multiple access (TDMA), code-division multiple access (CDMA), or space-division multiple access (SDMA). These protocols are utilized differently, at different levels of the theoretical OSI model.

Disadvantage: Crosstalk may cause interference among frequencies and disrupt the transmission.

- In FDMA, all users share the satellite transponder or frequency channel simultaneously but each user transmits at single frequency.
- FDMA can be used with both analog and digital signal but it generally used with analog signal.
- FDMA requires high-performing filters in the radio hardware, in contrast to TDMA and CDMA.
- FDMA is not vulnerable to the timing problems that TDMA has. Since a predetermined frequency band is available for the entire period of communication, stream data (a continuous flow of data that may not be packetized) can easily be used with FDMA.
- Due to the frequency filtering, FDMA is not sensitive to near–far problem which is pronounced for CDMA.
- Each user transmits and receives at different frequencies as each user gets a unique frequency slot.

FDMA is distinct from frequency division duplexing (FDD). While FDMA allows multiple users simultaneous access to a transmission system, FDD refers to how the radio channel is shared between the uplink and downlink (for instance, the traffic going back and forth between a mobile-phone and a mobile phone base station). Frequency-division multiplexing (FDM) is also distinct from FDMA. FDM is a physical layer technique that combines and transmits low-bandwidth channels through a high-bandwidth channel, like in a car radio. FDMA, on the other hand, is an access method in the data link layer.

FDMA also supports demand assignment in addition to fixed assignment. Demand assignment allows all users apparently continuous access of the radio spectrum by assigning carrier frequencies on a temporary basis using a statistical assignment process. The first FDMA demand-assignment system for satellite was developed by COMSAT for use on the Intelsat series IVA and V satellites.

There are two main techniques:

- Multi-channel per-carrier (MCPC)
- Single-channel per-carrier (SCPC)

== See also ==
- Code Division Multiple Access (CDMA)
