= Emphasis (telecommunications) =

Process for reducing noise

RIAA equalization curve for vinyl records

In signal processing, pre-emphasis is a technique to protect against anticipated noise and loss. The idea is to boost the frequency range that is most susceptible to noise and loss beforehand, so that after a noisy and lossy process (transmission over cable, tape recording...) more information can be recovered from that frequency range. Removal of the frequency boost caused by pre-emphasis is called de-emphasis, reducing the boosted frequency range back to its original amplitude.

Emphasis is commonly used in many places ranging from FM broadcasting (preemphasis improvement) and vinyl (e.g. LP) records to PCI Express. For example, high-frequency signal components may be emphasized to produce a more equal modulation index for a transmitted frequency spectrum, and therefore a better signal-to-noise ratio for the entire frequency range.

== In audio signals ==
In processing electronic audio signals, pre-emphasis refers to a system process designed to increase (within a frequency band) the magnitude of some (usually higher) frequencies with respect to the magnitude of other (usually lower) frequencies in order to improve the overall signal-to-noise ratio by minimizing the adverse effects of such phenomena as attenuation distortion or saturation of recording media in subsequent parts of the system. The mirror operation is called de-emphasis, and the system as a whole is called emphasis.

Pre-emphasis is achieved with a pre-emphasis network which is essentially a calibrated filter. The frequency response is decided by special time constants. The cutoff frequency can be calculated from that value.

Pre-emphasis is commonly used in telecommunications, digital audio recording, record cutting, in FM broadcasting transmissions, and in displaying the spectrograms of speech signals. One example of this is the RIAA equalization curve on 33 rpm and 45 rpm vinyl records. Another is the Dolby noise-reduction system as used with magnetic tape.

Pre-emphasis is employed in frequency modulation or phase modulation transmitters to equalize the modulating signal drive power in terms of deviation ratio. The receiver demodulation process includes a reciprocal network, called a de-emphasis network, to restore the original signal power distribution.

=== De-emphasis ===
In telecommunications, de-emphasis is the complement of pre-emphasis, in the antinoise system called emphasis. De-emphasis is a system process designed to decrease, (within a band of frequencies), the magnitude of some (usually higher) frequencies with respect to the magnitude of other (usually lower) frequencies in order to improve the overall signal-to-noise ratio by minimizing the adverse effects of such phenomena as attenuation distortion or saturation of recording media in subsequent parts of the system.

Special time constants dictate the frequency response curve, from which one can calculate the cutoff frequency.

=== Red Book audio ===
Although rarely used, there exists the capability for standardized emphasis in Red Book CD mastering. As CD players were originally implemented with affordable 14-bit converters, a specification for pre-emphasis was included to compensate for quantization noise. After economies of scale eventually allowed full 16 bits, quantization noise became less of a concern, but emphasis remained an option. The pre-emphasis is described as a first-order filter with a gain of 10 dB (at 20 dB/decade) and time constants 50 μs and 15 μs.

== In digital transmission ==
In serial data transmission, emphasis is used to improve signal quality at the output of a communication channel. In transmitting signals at high data rates, the transmission medium may introduce distortions, so emphasis is used to distort the transmitted signal to correct for this distortion. When done properly this produces a received signal that more closely resembles the original or desired signal, allowing the use of higher data rates or producing fewer bit errors. Most real world channels have loss that increases with frequency (effectively a low pass filter), so emphasis needs to invert this effect (functioning as a high pass filter). This makes emphasis a form of equalization, implemented at the transmit side of the channel.

Emphasis can be implemented either by boosting high frequencies (pre-emphasis, increasing the amplitude of transition bits) or attenuating low frequencies (de-emphasis, reducing the amplitude of non-transition bits). Both have the same net effect of producing a flatter system frequency response; de-emphasis is typically more convenient to do in real circuits since it only requires attenuation rather than amplification. Well-known serial data standards such as PCI Express, SATA and SAS require transmitted signals to use de-emphasis.

=== Effects of channel insertion loss ===
As a lossy channel becomes longer, high-frequency attenuation worsens and the signal will be increasingly distorted.

In the demonstration below, a 5 Gbps PRBS-9 test pattern is sent through PCB traces of various lengths on standard FR-4 material.

55 mm	300 mm
With a short channel, a small amount of ISI is visible however the eye is wide open.	As channel length increases, transition bits no longer reach their full amplitude. Multiple consecutive bits of the same value cause the signal to drift up or down. The eye is significantly more closed.

At some point, depending on the specifics of the channel, the transmitter, and the receiver, the signal will become too distorted for the receiver to correctly interpret it and the link will experience a high error rate or completely fail. Emphasis is one way to undo this distortion and enable communication to be successful over such a channel.

=== Analog R-C circuit ===
De-emphasis can be implemented by means of an analog high-pass filter circuit in parallel with an attenuator. This weakens the entire signal by a fixed amount, then allows extra energy to bypass the attenuator when the signal changes. The end result is a sharp spike at each transition, followed by an exponential decay to the steady-state amplitude.

In the demonstration below, a 5 Gbps PRBS-9 test pattern is sent through a 300 mm FR-4 channel with increasing levels of de-emphasis. Note that as the emphasis is increased, the signal amplitude is reduced.

0 dB	6 dB	12 dB
No emphasis. Significant ISI is visible.	Correct level of emphasis. The signal is attenuated but the eye is wide open and transition and non-transition bits have the same amplitude.	Excessive emphasis. Overshoot can be seen on transitions in the waveform view and the eye begins to close again with strong "banding" artifacts at zero crossings

Unlike the FIR architecture discussed in the next section, with analog emphasis the shape of the overshoot is *independent* of the signal bit rate. Thus, at lower data rates, the entire bit's amplitude is not increased, only the edge. In the example below, a deliberately excessive level of emphasis is used to make the overshoot more visible.

1.25 Gbps	5 Gbps
1.25 Gbps. The signal overshoots for about a third of the unit interval, then returns to near steady state.	Same test but at 5 Gbps. The overshoot lasts the entire UI.

=== 3-tap FIR ===
One common implementation of emphasis in real SERDES is a 3-tap feed-forward equalizer (FFE): rather than driving the output pin with the desired output voltage directly, the actual output voltage is a weighted sum of the desired bit value (main cursor), the previous bit (post cursor), and the next bit to be transmitted (pre cursor). The main cursor coefficient controls the nominal amplitude of the bit and is always positive (as a negative coefficient would invert the bit value). The precursor coefficient removes ISI at the receiver caused by bits which have not yet arrived (e.g., fields coupling across meanders in a delay-matched trace) and is typically zero or a very small negative value, as this is often not a major contribution to total ISI. The post cursor coefficient removes ISI at the receiver caused by the immediately preceding bit and is typically a larger negative value, with lossier channels requiring a larger tap value. Higher numbers of taps are possible but increase circuit complexity and tend to result in diminishing returns so are not commonly used.

The effects of emphasis on a signal can be clearly seen in the eye pattern. In the following demonstration, we consider a 10.3125 Gbps PRBS-31 test pattern with NRZ modulation, typical for testing 10-Gigabit Ethernet. The channel has an insertion loss of roughly 2 dB at the fundamental, 3 dB at the 2nd harmonic, and 4 dB at the 3rd. The goal is to achieve a well-equalized channel response in which the eye is maximally open without excessive overshoot. Excessive equalization can worsen jitter, increase overshoot, and result in a less open eye than a properly equalized signal.

	Baseline	Excessive pre cursor	Optimized	Excessive post cursor
	Baseline signal with no emphasis. Transition bits are clearly weaker than non-transition bits and the signal is touching the mask (fail).	Excessive pre-cursor emphasis. The eye is more closed than the baseline, indicating minimal pre-cursor ISI was present and the emphasis is doing more harm than good.	Well-tuned post-cursor emphasis. The eye is open and transition and non-transition bits are well matched in amplitude, indicating a correct level of equalization. The signal is passing the mask test.	Excessive post-cursor emphasis. The eye is starting to close and transition bits have significant overshoot, indicating excessive equalization. The "double banding" artifact visible in the eye indicates the presence of significant ISI caused by the excessive emphasis.
Width	Worst	Better	Best	Better
Height	Good	Bad	Best	Bad
Jitter	Worst	Better	Best	Better
