= Digital transmission group =

In telecommunications, a digital transmission group is a group of digitized voice or data channels or both with bit streams that are combined into a single digital bit stream for transmission over communications media.

Digital transmission groups usually are categorized by their maximum capacity, not by a specific number of channels. However, the maximum digital transmission group capacity must be equal to or greater than the sum of the individual multiplexer input channel capacities.

== See also ==
- Digital Signal 1
- E-carrier
- Plesiochronous Digital Hierarchy
