= Loading characteristic =

In multichannel telephone systems, the loading characteristic is a plot, for the busy hour, of the equivalent mean power and the peak power as a function of the number of voice channels.

The equivalent power of a multichannel signal referred to the zero transmission level point is a function of the number of channels and has for its basis a specified voice channel mean power.
