= Interposition (disambiguation) =

Interposition is an asserted right of a U.S. state to oppose actions of the federal government.

Interposition may also refer to:

- Interposition trunk, a type of telecommunications channel
- Interposition (grammar), a usage of a preposition between identical words
- Interposition, also known as occultation, a depth perception cue

== See also ==
- Interposed nucleus, in the cerebellum
- Interposer, an electrical interface
- Interference (chess)
