= Bypass (telecommunications) =

In telecommunications, the term bypass has these meanings:

1. The use of any telecommunications facilities or services that circumvents those of the local exchange common carrier.
  Note: Bypass facilities or services may be either customer-provided or vendor-supplied.
2. An alternate circuit that is routed around equipment or a system component.
  Note: Bypasses are often used to let system operation continue when the bypassed equipment or a system component is inoperable or unavailable.
