= Return channel =

In communications systems, the return channel (also reverse channel or return link) is the transmission link from a user terminal to the central hub. Return links are often, but not always, slower than the corresponding forward links. Examples where this is true include asymmetric digital subscriber line, cable modems, mobile broadband and satellite internet access.

The return channel need not use the same medium as the main channel. For example, some hybrid Internet access services use a one-way cable television system for the forward channel and a dial-up modem for the return channel. Even when the return and forward channels use the same medium, their differences often dictate the use of very different data modulation and coding techniques. For example, in a star radio network, only the central hub transmits on the forward link, so channel access method is a consideration only on the return link.

The "forward/return" terminology is also used for spacecraft communication links for command and telemetry. Because the return link carries telemetry, often including imagery, it is often orders of magnitude faster than the forward link that transmits only a few predefined spacecraft commands.

Return and forward channels are distinct from, and should not be confused with, uplinks and downlinks in satellite communication systems. For example, satellite internet access with conventional bent-pipe transponders require a total of two uplinks and two downlinks. One uplink and downlink pair are used for the forward link from the central ground hub through the satellite to the user terminal, and another uplink/downlink pair are used for the return link from the user terminal to the central hub.

== See also ==
- Backward channel
- Upstream (networking)
- Backhaul (telecommunications)
