= Transmitter power output =

Power of a transmitter in watts or dBm

In radio transmission, transmitter power output (TPO) is the actual amount of power (in watts) of radio frequency (RF) energy that a transmitter produces at its output.

TPO is a concept related to effective radiated power (ERP), but refers to the power output of a transmitter, without accounting for antenna system gain. The ERP for VHF/UHF transmitters is normally more than the TPO, for LF/MF transmitters it has nearly the same value, while for VLF transmitters it may be less. The term TPO is commonly used in the US, but other countries often say simply 'transmitter power' or 'forward power'. TPO can (and often is) less than the maximum rated power of a transmitter. It will be set to provide the desired/licensed ERP according to the formula below.

== Signal formula ==
The radio antenna's design focuses the signal, creating gain and increasing the ERP. There is also some negative gain (loss) from the feedline and other components such as filters, which reduces the TPO to the antenna due to both resistance and by radiating a small part of the signal.

The basic equation relating transmitter power output to effective radiated power is

$$\mathrm{TPO}_{\mathrm{dBW}}+\mathrm{gain}_{\mathrm{feedline,dB}}+\mathrm{gain}_{\mathrm{antenna,dBd}}=\mathrm{ERP}_{\mathrm{dBW}}.$$

Note that in this formula the antenna gain is expressed with reference to a dipole (dBd)

== See also ==
- Effective radiated power
- Nominal power
- Signal strength
- RF power margin
