= Interposition trunk =

Telecommunications infrastructure

In telecommunications, the term interposition trunk has the following meanings:

1. A single direct communication channel, e.g., voice-frequency circuit, between two positions of a large switchboard to facilitate the interconnection of other circuits appearing at the respective switchboard positions.

2. Within a technical control facility, a single direct transmission circuit, between positions in a testboard or patch bay, which circuit facilitates testing or patching between the respective positions.

This article incorporates public domain material from Federal Standard 1037C. General Services Administration. Archived from the original on 2022-01-22. (in support of MIL-STD-188).
