= Performance measurement period =

Teletraffic period

In telecommunications, performance measurement period is the period during which performance parameters are measured.

A performance measurement period is determined by required confidence limits and may vary as a function of the observed parameter values. User time is divided into consecutive performance measurement periods to enable measurement of user information transfer reliability.
