= Information transfer =

Sending information over a communications medium

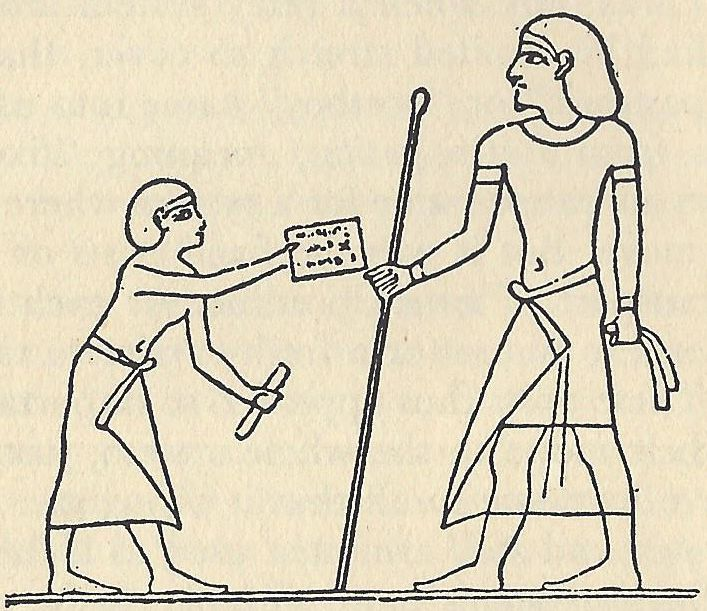
Ancient Egyptian drawing depicting a courier delivering a letter.

In telecommunications, information transfer is the process of moving messages containing user information from a source to a sink via a communication channel. In this sense, information transfer is equivalent to data transmission which highlights more practical, technical aspects.

The information transfer rate may or may not be equal to the transmission modulation rate.

Bidirectional information transfer is called information exchange.

== Non-technical meaning ==
In a non-technical context, information transfer is sometimes used to signify knowledge transfer or teaching. A successful transfer of information depends on many aspects, not least the choice of the specific medium (media-adequacy).

== See also ==
- Federal Standard 1037C in support of MIL-STD-188.
- Information-transfer transaction
