= Semiautomatic switching system =

Telecommunication switching system

In telecommunications, the term semiautomatic switching system has the following meanings:

1. In telephone systems, a switching system in which telephone operators receive call instructions orally from users and complete them by automatic equipment.
2. At tape relay intermediate stations, the manual routing or rerouting of taped messages without rekeying them.
