= Dropout (communications) =

Momentary loss of signal

A dropout is a momentary loss of signal in a communications system, usually caused by noise, propagation anomalies, or system malfunctions. For analog signals, a dropout is frequently gradual and partial, depending on the cause. For digital signals, dropouts are more pronounced, usually being sudden and complete, due to the cliff effect. In mobile telephony, a dropout of more than a few seconds will result in a dropped call.
