= Connections per circuit hour =

In telecommunications, the term connections per circuit hour (CCH) has the following meanings:

- A unit of teletraffic measurement expressed as the number of connections established at a switching point per hour.
- A unit of traffic measurement used to express the rate at which circuits are established at a switch.

The magnitude of the CCH is an instantaneous value subject to change as a function of time (i.e. from moment to moment), and is subject to study including load curve and busy hour as other measures of traffic are.

== See also ==
- Busy Hour Call Attempts
