= Packet-switching node =

A packet-switching node is a node in a packet-switching network that contains data switches and equipment for controlling, formatting, transmitting, routing, and receiving data packets.

Note: In the Defense Data Network (DDN), a packet-switching node is usually configured to support up to thirty-two X.25 56 kbit/s host connections, as many as six 56 kbit/s interswitch trunk (IST) lines to other packet-switching nodes, and at least one Terminal Access Controller (TAC).

This article incorporates public domain material from Federal Standard 1037C. General Services Administration. Archived from the original on 2022-01-22. (in support of MIL-STD-188).
