= Bit-count integrity =

In telecommunications, the term bit-count integrity (BCI) has the following meanings:

1. In message communications, the preservation of the exact number of bits that are in the original message.
2. In connection-oriented services, preservation of the number of bits per unit time.

Note: Bit-count integrity is not the same as bit integrity, which requires that the delivered bits correspond exactly with the original bits.
