= Microelectronics =

Subfield of electronics

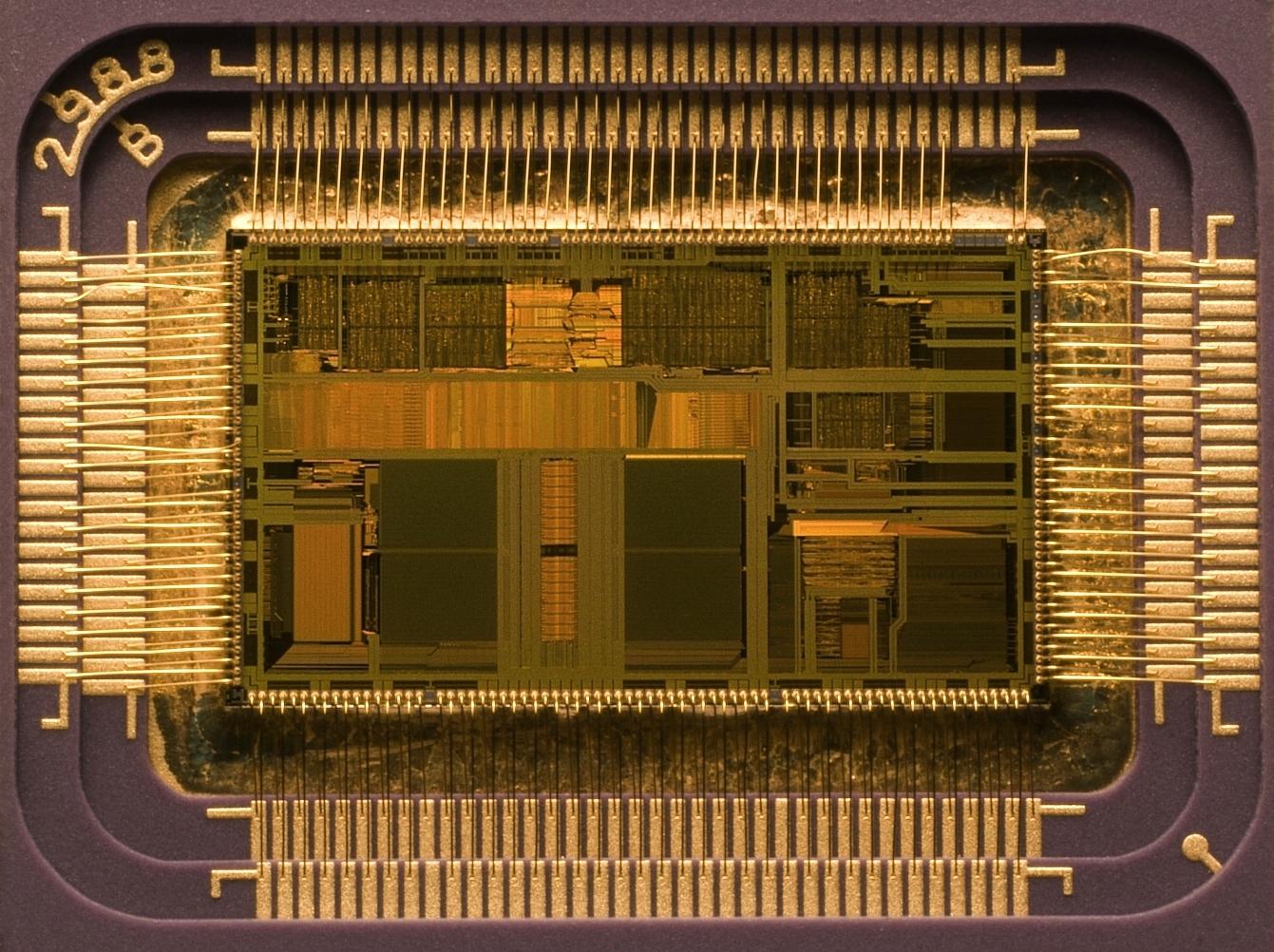
An integrated circuit (IC) as an example application in the field of microelectronics. The chip housing is opened to allow a view of the actual circuit. The golden connecting cables, which form the electrical wiring between the IC and the housing contacts, can be seen on the sides.

Microelectronics is a subfield of electronics. As the name suggests, microelectronics relates to the study and manufacture (or microfabrication) of very small electronic designs and components. Usually, but not always, this means micrometre-scale or smaller. These devices are typically made from semiconductor materials. Many components of a normal electronic design are available in a microelectronic equivalent. These include transistors, capacitors, inductors, resistors, diodes and (naturally) insulators and conductors can all be found in microelectronic devices. Unique wiring techniques such as wire bonding are also often used in microelectronics because of the unusually small size of the components, leads and pads. This technique requires specialized equipment and is expensive.

Digital integrated circuits (ICs) consist of billions of transistors, resistors, diodes, and capacitors. Analog circuits commonly contain resistors and capacitors as well. Inductors are used in some high frequency analog circuits, but tend to occupy a larger chip area due to their lower reactance at low frequencies. Gyrators can replace them in many applications.

As techniques have improved, the scale of microelectronic components has continued to decrease. At smaller scales, the relative impact of intrinsic circuit properties, such as unintended interactions between components or their parts, may become more significant. These are called parasitic effects, and the goal of the microelectronics design engineer is to find ways to compensate for or to minimize these effects, while delivering smaller, faster, and cheaper devices.

Today, microelectronics design is largely aided by electronic design automation (EDA) software.

== See also ==
- Comparison of EDA software
- Digital electronics
- Electrical engineering
- Kelvin probe force microscope
- IMEC - Interuniversity Microelectronics Centre
- Macroelectronics
- Microscale chemistry
- Nanoelectronics
