= Demand assignment =

In telecommunications, a demand assignment is a method which several users share access to a communication channel on a real-time basis, i.e., a user needing to communicate with another user on the same network requests the required circuit, uses it, and when the call is finished, the circuit is released, making the circuit available to other users.

Demand assignment is similar to conventional telephone switching, in which common trunks are provided for many users, on a demand basis, through a limited-size trunk group.

== See also ==
- Time-assignment speech interpolation
