= Effective data transfer rate =

Information transmission rate

In telecommunications, effective data transfer rate is the average number of units of data, such as bits, characters, blocks, or frames, transferred per unit time from a source and accepted as valid by a sink.

Note: The effective data transfer rate is usually expressed in bits, characters, blocks, or frames per second. The effective data transfer rate may be averaged over a period of seconds, minutes, or hours.
