= Periscope antenna =

In telecommunications, a periscope antenna is an antenna configuration in which the transmitting antenna is oriented to produce a vertical radiation pattern, and a flat or off-axis parabolic reflector, mounted above the transmitting antenna, is used to direct the beam in a horizontal path toward the receiving antenna.

A periscope antenna facilitates increased terrain clearance without long transmission lines, while permitting the active equipment to be located at or near ground level for ease of maintenance.

== Sources ==
- This article incorporates public domain material from Federal Standard 1037C. General Services Administration. Archived from the original on 2022-01-22. (in support of MIL-STD-188).
