= Baud =

Symbol rate measurement in telecommunications

In telecommunications and electronics, baud (/bɔːd/; symbol: Bd) is a common unit of measurement of symbol rate, which is one of the components that determine the speed of communication over a data channel.

It is the unit for symbol rate or modulation rate in symbols per second or pulses per second. It is the number of distinct symbol changes (signalling events) made to the transmission medium per second in a digitally modulated signal or a bd rate line code.

Baud is related to gross bit rate, which can be expressed in bits per second (bit/s). If there are precisely two symbols in the system (typically 0 and 1), then baud and bits per second are equivalent.

== Naming ==
The baud unit is named after Émile Baudot, the inventor of the Baudot code for telegraphy, and is represented according to the rules for SI units. That is, the first letter of its symbol is uppercase (Bd), but when the unit is spelled out, it should be written in lowercase (baud) except when it begins a sentence or is capitalized for another reason, such as in title case. It was defined by the CCITT (now the ITU-T) in November 1926. The earlier standard had been the number of words per minute, which was a less robust measure since word length can vary.

== Definitions ==
The symbol duration time, also known as the unit interval, can be directly measured as the time between transitions by looking at an eye diagram of the signal on an oscilloscope. The symbol duration time T_{s} can be calculated as:

$$T_\text{s}  =  {1 \over f_\text{s}},$$

where f_{s} is the symbol rate. There is also a chance of miscommunication, which leads to ambiguity.

Example: Communication at the baud rate 1000 Bd means communication by means of sending 1000 symbols per second. In the case of a modem, this corresponds to 1000 tones per second; similarly, in the case of a line code, this corresponds to 1000 pulses per second. The symbol duration time is 1/1000 second (that is, 1 millisecond).

The baud is scaled using standard metric prefixes, so that, for example

- 1 kBd (kilobaud) = 1000 Bd
- 1 MBd (megabaud) = 1000 kBd
- 1 GBd (gigabaud) = 1000 MBd

== Relationship to gross bit rate ==
The symbol rate is related to gross bit rate expressed in bit/s. The term baud has sometimes incorrectly been used to mean bit rate, since these rates are the same in old modems as well as in the simplest digital communication links using only one bit per symbol, such that binary digit 0 is represented by one symbol, and binary digit 1 by another symbol. In more advanced modems and data transmission techniques, a symbol may have more than two states, so it may represent more than one bit. A bit (binary digit) always represents one of two states.

If N bits are conveyed per symbol, and the gross bit rate is R, inclusive of channel coding overhead, the symbol rate f_{s} can be calculated as

$$f_\text{s}  =   {R \over N}.$$

By taking information per pulse N in bit/pulse to be the base-2-logarithm of the number of distinct messages M that could be sent, Hartley constructed a measure of the gross bit rate R as

$R = f_\text{s} N\quad$ where $\quad N = \left \lceil \log_2(M) \right \rceil.$

Here, the $\left \lceil x \right \rceil$ denotes the ceiling function of $x$, where $x$ is taken to be any real number greater than zero; the ceiling function rounds up to the nearest natural number (e.g., $\left \lceil 2.11 \right \rceil = 3$).

In that case, M = 2^{N} different symbols are used. In a modem, these may be time-limited sine wave tones with unique combinations of amplitude, phase or frequency. For example, in a 64QAM modem, M = 64, and so the bit rate is N = log_{2}(64) = 6 times the baud rate. In a line code, these may be M different voltage levels.

The ratio is not necessarily an integer; in 4B3T coding, the bit rate is 4/3 of the baud rate. (A typical basic rate interface with a 160 kbit/s raw data rate operates at 120 kBd.)

Codes with many symbols, and thus a bit rate higher than the symbol rate, are most useful on channels such as telephone lines with a limited bandwidth but a high signal-to-noise ratio within that bandwidth. In other applications, the bit rate is less than the symbol rate. Eight-to-fourteen modulation as used on audio CDs has bit rate 8/17 (Note: EFM requires three merging bits between adjacent fourteen-bit codewords.) of the baud rate.

== See also ==
- Commonly used symbol rates
- Constellation diagram
- List of device bandwidths
- Mark and space
- Nyquist rate
- Pulse-code modulation
