= Slip (telecommunication) =

In telecommunications, positional displacement in a sequence of transmitted symbols

In telecommunications, a slip is a positional displacement in a sequence of transmitted symbols that causes the loss or insertion of one or more symbols. Slips are usually caused by inadequate synchronization of the two clocks controlling the transmission or by poor reception of the signal.
