= Interchange circuit =

Circuit that facilitates the exchange of data and signaling information

In telecommunications, an interchange circuit is a circuit that facilitates the exchange of data and signaling information between data terminal equipment (DTE) and data circuit-terminating equipment (DCE).

An interchange circuit can carry many types of signals and provide many types of service features, such as control signals, timing signals, and common return functions.
