= Mediation function =

Telecommunications network management function

In telecommunications network management, a mediation function is a function that routes or acts on information passing between network elements and network operations.

Examples of mediation functions are communications control, protocol conversion, data handling, communications of primitives, processing that includes decision-making, and data storage.

Mediation functions can be shared among network elements, mediation devices, and network operation centers.

== Sources ==
This article incorporates public domain material from Federal Standard 1037C. General Services Administration. Archived from the original on 2022-01-22. (in support of MIL-STD-188).
