= Primary channel =

In telecommunications, the term primary channel has the following meanings:

1. The communication channel that is designated as a prime transmission channel and is used as the first choice in restoring priority circuits.
2. In a communications network, the channel that has the highest data rate of all the channels sharing a common interface.
3. The main Television channel of several operated by a broadcaster.

A primary channel may support the transfer of information in one direction only, either direction alternately, or both directions simultaneously.

1. On a computer motherboard, it is the first physical connector for an IDE or ATA drive.

== Sources ==
- This article incorporates public domain material from Federal Standard 1037C. General Services Administration. Archived from the original on 2022-01-22. (in support of MIL-STD-188).
