= Speed of service =

In telecommunications, time for a message to be received

In telecommunications, speed of service is the time for a message to be received. For example:

1. The time between release of a message by the originator to receipt of the message by the addressee, as perceived by the end user. (originator-to-recipient speed of service)
2. The time between entry of a message into a communications system and receipt of the message at the terminating communications facility, i.e., the communications facility serving the addressee, as measured by the system.
