= Frame slip =

In the reception of framed data, a frame slip is the loss of synchronization between a received frame and the receiver clock signal, causing a frame misalignment event, and resulting in the loss of the data contained in the received frame.

A frame slip should not be confused with a dropped frame where synchronization is not lost, as in the case of buffer overflow, for example.
