= Wideband modem =

Type of modem

In telecommunications, the term wideband modem has the following meanings:

1. A modem whose modulated output signal can have an essential frequency spectrum that is broader than that which can be wholly contained within, and faithfully transmitted through, a voice channel with a nominal 4 kHz bandwidth.
2. A modem whose bandwidth capability is greater than that of a narrowband modem.
