= Relative transmission level =

In telecommunications, relative transmission level is the ratio of the signal power, at a given point in a transmission system, to a reference signal power.

The ratio is usually determined by applying a standard test tone at zero transmission level point (or applying adjusted test tone power at any other point) and measuring the gain or loss to the location of interest. A distinction should be made between the standard test tone power and the expected median power of the actual signal required as the basis for the design of transmission systems.

This article incorporates public domain material from Federal Standard 1037C. General Services Administration. Archived from the original on 2022-01-22. (in support of MIL-STD-188).
