= Conditioning equipment =

In telecommunications, the term conditioning equipment has the following meanings:

1. At junctions of circuits, equipment used to obtain desired circuit characteristics, such as matched transmission levels, matched impedances, and equalization between facilities.
2. Corrective networks used to improve data transmission, such as equalization of the insertion loss-vs.-frequency characteristic and the envelope delay distortion over a desired frequency range.
