= Balance return loss =

Telecommunication theory

In telecommunications, balance return loss is one of two things:

- A measure of the degree of balance between two impedances connected to two conjugate sides of a hybrid set, coil, network, or junction.
- A measure of the effectiveness with which a balancing network simulates the impedance of a two-wire circuit at a hybrid coil.
