= Standard test signal =

Single-frequency signal used for telecommunications testing

In telecommunications, a standard test signal is a single-frequency signal with standardized level used for testing the peak power transmission capability and for measuring the total harmonic distortion of circuits or parts of an electric circuit.

Standardized test signal levels and frequencies are listed in MIL-STD-188-100 and in the Code of Federal Regulations Title 47, part 68.

== See also ==
- Standard test tone
