= Kendall effect =

Spurious pattern or other distortion in a facsimile

In telecommunications the Kendall effect is a spurious pattern or other distortion in a facsimile.

It is caused by unwanted modulation products which arise from the transmission of the carrier signal, and appear in the form of a rectified baseband that interferes with the lower sideband of the carrier.

The Kendall effect occurs principally when the single-sideband width is greater than half of the facsimile carrier frequency.
