= Preemphasis improvement =

Signal enhancement

In FM broadcasting, preemphasis improvement is the improvement in the signal-to-noise ratio of the high-frequency portion of the baseband, i.e., modulating signal, which improvement results from passing the modulating signal through a preemphasis network before transmission.

The reason that preemphasis is needed is that the process of detecting a frequency-modulated signal in a receiver produces a noise spectrum that rises in frequency (a so-called triangular spectrum). Without preemphasis, the received audio would sound unacceptably noisy at high frequencies, especially under conditions of low carrier-to-noise ratio, i.e., during fringe reception conditions. Preemphasis increases the magnitude of the higher signal frequencies, thereby improving the signal-to-noise ratio. At the output of the discriminator in the FM receiver, a deemphasis network restores the original signal power distribution.

FM improvement factor is the quotient obtained by dividing the signal-to-noise ratio (SNR) at the output of an FM receiver by the carrier-to-noise ratio (CNR) at the input of the receiver. When the FM improvement factor is greater than unity, the improvement in the SNR is always obtained at the expense of an increased bandwidth in the receiver and the transmission path.

FM improvement threshold is the point in an FM (frequency modulation) receiver at which the peaks in the RF signal equal the peaks of the thermal noise generated in the receiver. A baseband signal-to-noise ratio of about 30 dB is typical at the improvement threshold, and this ratio improves 1 dB for each decibel of increase in the signal above the threshold.

== Sources ==
- This article incorporates public domain material from Federal Standard 1037C. General Services Administration. Archived from the original on 2022-01-22.
