= Balancing network =

In a hybrid set, hybrid coil, or resistance hybrid, balancing network is a circuit used to match, i.e., to balance, the impedance of a uniform transmission line, (e.g., a twisted metallic pair, coaxial cable, etc.) over a selected range of frequencies. A balancing network is required to ensure isolation between the two ports of the four-wire side of the hybrid.

A balancing network can also be a device used between a balanced device or line and an unbalanced device or line for the purpose of transforming from balanced to unbalanced or from unbalanced to balanced.

Source: from Federal Standard 1037C and from MIL-STD-188

== See also ==
- balun
