= Narrative traffic =

Narrative traffic is data communications consisting of plain or encrypted messages written in a natural language and transmitted in accordance with standard formats and procedures.

Examples of narrative traffic include:

- Messages that are placed on paper tape and transmitted via a teletypewriter (TTY), and on reception, are converted back to a printed page on another teletypewriter or teleprinter
- Messages printed on a sheet of paper, transmitted via optical character recognition (OCR) equipment, and on reception, converted back to a printed page on a printer.
