= One-way trunk =

Telecommunication trunk

In telecommunications, a one-way trunk is a trunk between two switching centers, over which traffic may be originated from one preassigned location only.

The traffic may consist of two-way communications; the expression "one way" refers only to the origin of the demand for a connection. At the originating end, the one-way trunk is known as an "outgoing trunk"; at the other end, it is known as an "incoming trunk".
