= Circuit reliability =

Circuit reliability (also time availability) (CiR) is the percentage of time an electronic circuit was available for use in a specified period of scheduled availability. Circuit reliability is given by

$$T_s = T_a + T_o$$

where $T_o$ is the circuit total outage time, $T_s$ is the circuit total scheduled time, and $T_a$ is the circuit total available time. In addition, circuit reliability is the expected lifespan of operation of a functioning system under nominal conditions.
