= Channel reliability =

In telecommunications, channel reliability (ChR) is the percentage of time a communication channel was available for use in a specified period of scheduled availability.

Channel reliability is given by

$$ChR = 100 (1 - \frac{T_o}{T_s} ) = 100 \frac{T_a}{T_s}$$

where T _{o} is the channel total outage time, T _{s} is the channel total scheduled time, and T _{a} is the channel total available time.
