= Shadow loss =

In telecommunications, the term shadow loss has the following meanings:

1. The attenuation caused to a radio signal by obstructions in the propagation path.
2. In a reflector antenna, the relative reduction in the effective aperture of the antenna caused by the masking effect of other antenna parts, such as a feed horn or a secondary reflector, which parts obstruct the radiation path.
