= Facsimile converter =

One of two devices in telecommunications

In telecommunications, the term facsimile converter has the following meanings:

1. In a facsimile receiver, a device that changes the signal modulation from frequency-shift keying (FSK) to amplitude modulation (AM).
2. In a facsimile transmitter, a device that changes the signal modulation from amplitude modulation (AM) to frequency-shift keying (FSK).
