= Interconnect facility =

Interconnect facility: In a communications network, one or more communications links that (a) are used to provide local area communications service among several locations and (b) collectively form a node in the network.

An interconnect facility may include network control and administrative circuits as well as the primary traffic circuits.

An interconnect facility may use any medium available and may be redundant.
