= Call volume =

Telephone term

In telecommunications, call volume refers to the number of telephone calls made during a certain time period. Depending on context, the phrase may refer to either the number of calls made to a specific physical area or telephone number (such as an emergency service) or the number of calls made between two or more areas (e.g. cities).

Calls Per Second or CPS refers to how many telephone calls can be handled in a second. CPS is one measure of the performance of Switching systems. It helps in estimating Busy-hour call attempts (BHCA) and Busy-hour call completion (BHCC) of Switching systems.

Various formulas exist to forecast the number of calls that might be made; another key distinction concerns whether long or short-term trends are to be predicted.

== See also ==
- Teletraffic engineering
