= Card standards =

Card standard(s) may refer to any amount of numbers of ISO standards related to smartcards.

- ISO/IEC 7810 Identification cards — Physical characteristics
- ISO/IEC 7812 Identification cards — Identification of issuers
- ISO/IEC 7816 Identification cards — Integrated circuit cards (withdrawn; now amended into ISO/IEC7810)
- ISO/IEC 14443 Cards and security devices for personal identification — Contactless proximity objects

== See also ==
- List of ISO standards
