= Refractive index contrast =

Refractive index contrast, in an optical waveguide, such as an optical fiber, is a measure of the relative difference in refractive index of the core and cladding. The refractive index contrast, Δ, is often given by $\Delta={n_1^2-n_2^2 \over 2 n_1^2}$, where n_{1} is the maximum refractive index in the core (or simply the core index for a step-index profile) and n_{2} is the refractive index of the cladding. The criterion n_{2} < n_{1} must be satisfied in order to sustain a guided mode by total internal reflection. Alternative formulations include $\Delta=\sqrt{n_1^2-n_2^2}$ and $\Delta = {n_1-n_2 \over n_1}$. Normal optical fibers, constructed of different glasses, have very low refractive index contrast (Δ<<1) and hence are weakly-guiding. The weak guiding will cause a greater portion of the cross-sectional Electric field profile to reside within the cladding (as evanescent tails of the guided mode) as compared to strongly-guided waveguides. Integrated optics can make use of higher core index to obtain Δ>1 allowing light to be efficiently guided around corners on the micro-scale, where popular high-Δ material platform is silicon-on-insulator. High-Δ allows sub-wavelength core dimensions and so greater control over the size of the evanescent tails. The most efficient low-loss optical fibers require low Δ to minimise losses to light scattered outwards.
