= Data link =

Means of connecting one location to another in order to transmit information between them

A data link is a means of connecting one location to another for the purpose of transmitting and receiving digital information (data communication). It can also refer to a set of electronics assemblies, consisting of a transmitter and a receiver (two pieces of data terminal equipment) and the interconnecting data telecommunication circuit. These are governed by a link protocol enabling digital data to be transferred from a data source to a data sink.

== Types ==
There are at least three types of basic data-link configurations that can be conceived of and used:

- Simplex communications, most commonly meaning all communications in one direction only.
- Half-duplex communications, meaning communications in both directions, but not both ways simultaneously.
- Duplex communications, communications in both directions simultaneously.

== Aviation ==
In civil aviation, a data-link system (known as Controller Pilot Data Link Communications) is used to send information between aircraft and air traffic controllers for example when an aircraft is too far from the ATC to make voice radio communication and radar observations possible. Such systems are used for aircraft crossing the Atlantic, Pacific and Indian oceans. One such system, used by Nav Canada and NATS over the North Atlantic, uses a five-digit data link sequence number confirmed between air traffic control and the pilots of the aircraft before the aircraft proceeds to cross the ocean. This system uses the aircraft's flight management computer to send location, speed and altitude information about the aircraft to the ATC. ATC can then send messages to the aircraft regarding any necessary change of course.

In unmanned aircraft, land vehicles, boats, and spacecraft, a two-way (full-duplex or half-duplex) data-link is used to send control signals, and to receive telemetry.

== See also ==
- ACARS
- NASA Deep Space Network
- Space probe
- Tactical data link
- Terminal (telecommunication)
- Timex Datalink
- Unmanned aerial vehicle

== Sources ==
- This article incorporates public domain material from Federal Standard 1037C. General Services Administration. Archived from the original on 2022-01-22. (in support of MIL-STD-188).
