= Separate-channel signaling =

Separate-channel signaling is a form of signaling in which the whole or a part of one or more channels in a multichannel system is used to provide for supervisory and control signals for the message traffic channels.

The same channels, such as frequency bands or time slots, that are used for signaling are not used for message traffic. This is used for E-carrier telecommunications.

== See also ==
- Common-channel signaling
