= Multiplex baseband =

In telecommunications, the term multiplex baseband has the following meanings:

1. In frequency-division multiplexing, the frequency band occupied by the aggregate of the signals in the line interconnecting the multiplexing and radio or line equipment.
2. In frequency division multiplexed carrier systems, at the input to any stage of frequency translation, the frequency band occupied.

For example, the output of a group multiplexer consists of a band of frequencies from 60 kHz to 108 kHz. This is the group-level baseband that results from combining 12 voice-frequency input channels, having a bandwidth of 4 kHz each, including guard bands. In turn, 5 groups are multiplexed into a super group having a baseband of 312 kHz to 552 kHz. This baseband, however, does not represent a group-level baseband. Ten super groups are in turn multiplexed into one master group, the output of which is a baseband that may be used to modulate a microwave-frequency carrier.
