= Intermediate-field region =

In antenna theory, intermediate-field region (also known as intermediate field, intermediate zone or transition zone) refers to the transition region lying between the near-field region and the far-field region in which the field strength of an electromagnetic wave is dependent upon the inverse distance, inverse square of the distance, and the inverse cube of the distance from the antenna. For an antenna that is small compared to the wavelength in question, the intermediate-field region is considered to exist at all distances between 0.1 wavelength and 1.0 wavelength from the antenna.
