= Joint multichannel trunking and switching system =

Composite multichannel trunking and switching system formed from assets of the Services

The Joint multichannel trunking and switching system is that composite multichannel trunking and switching system formed from assets of the Services, the Defense Communications System, other available systems, and/or assets controlled by the Joint Chiefs of Staff to provide an operationally responsive, survivable communication system, preferably in a mobile/transportable/recoverable configuration, for the joint force commander in an area of operations.
