= Thermal tails =

Thermal tails are an effect found in amplifiers, typically in op-amps, emitter-followers, and differential pairs. The effect is to cause a slow drift from ideal of the output of the amplifier from ideal over time. The cause is the mismatch of temperature of the different transistors on the substrate. Differential pairs have poor recovery from temperature mismatch.

The extent of the problem can be determined from the thermal conductivity of the substrate. The lower it is, the more of an issue this will be. It can also be caused by a non-shallow trench isolation.

When the power dissipation of a BJT changes the temperature changes. This causes a change in Vbe, thus affecting the output.

Thermal tails generally start on the output transistor as it is the one delivering the most power.

A thermal tail can be quantified by either loading the output stage of the amplifier or by conducting an AC frequency plot and looking for a rolloff not found due to parasitical components.
