= Endurability =

Property

In telecommunications, endurability is the property of a system, subsystem, equipment, or process that enables it to continue to function within specified performance limits for an extended period of time, usually months, despite a severe natural or man-made disturbance, such as a nuclear attack, or a loss of external logistic or utility support.

Endurability is not compromised by temporary failures when the local capability exists to restore and maintain the system, subsystem, equipment, or process to an acceptable performance level.
