= Reference antenna =

A reference antenna is an antenna with known performance. It is normally used to calibrate other systems.

During a relative calibration, an antenna's phase center offset (PCO) and phase center variations (PCV) are computed with respect to the reference antenna which is normally assigned zero PCV values. A relative calibration is therefore biased by the phase advance/delay experienced by the reference antenna.

In contrast, during an absolute calibration, the antenna being tested is moved via a robot so that a particular satellite is received at different angles by the test and reference antennas. This allows the reference antenna effects to be cancelled, leaving behind only the PCO and PCV of the test antenna.

Reference antennas are built with particular care taken to make them simple, robust and repeatable. In a common usage scenario a reference antenna would be used as a transfer standard. First the reference antenna's performance is measured using high accuracy measurement facility. This test may be done using an electromagnetic anechoic chamber or another type of antenna test range (see Antenna measurements). The antenna is then measured using a second antenna test facility. The results from the two are compared, the comparison can reveal the accuracy of the second test facility. It can also be used to calibrate the second facility.

Sometimes rather than measure the performance of the reference antenna theoretical methods are used. The antenna may be simulated using electromagnetic simulation, or its properties derived from formulae based on electromagnetic theory. These methods are only useful if the materials and dimensions of the antenna can be characterised very well, and the mathematics of the simulation or formulae used is known to be accurate.

Normally the parameter of interest is antenna gain. In this case the reference antenna is built to have a high degree of repeatability in its radiation pattern and boresight gain. A common practice is to measure the boresight gain of a reference antenna across its operational frequency band. Other parameters are sometimes of interest though, such as antenna efficiency.

Common reference antennas are horns, dipoles, monopoles and biconicals. These types are chosen because they are mechanically simple and quite electrically simple. Mechanical simplicity makes building repeatable antennas easier. Electrical simplicity makes design easier and allows use of design formulae that are known to be accurate.

The International Telecommunication Union maintains a database of reference antenna radiation patterns. These radiation patterns are theoretical equivalents to physical reference antennas.
