= Release time (telecommunications) =

Time interval in telecommunication theory

In telecommunications, release time is the time interval for a circuit to respond when an enabling signal is discontinued, for example:

1. in an automatic gain control or echo suppressor circuit, the time interval between the end of the enabling signal and the instant at which suppression ceases,
2. for a relay, the time between when the coil is de-energized, and the instant that contact closure ceases or is established.
