= Master frequency generator =

A master frequency generator or master electronic oscillator, in frequency-division multiplexing (FDM), is a piece of equipment used to provide system end-to-end carrier frequency synchronization and frequency accuracy of tones.

The following types of oscillators are used in the Defense Communications System FDM systems:

- Type 1 - A master carrier oscillator as an integral part of the multiplexer set.
- Type 2 - A submaster oscillator equipment or slave oscillator equipment as an integral part of the multiplexer set.
- Type 3 - An external master oscillator equipment that has extremely accurate and stable characteristics.
