= Bit pairing =

In telecommunications, bit pairing is the practice of establishing, within a code set, a number of subsets that have an identical bit representation except for the state of a specified bit.

Note: An example of bit pairing occurs in the International Alphabet No. 5 and the American Standard Code for Information Interchange (ASCII), where the uppercase letters are related to their respective lowercase letters by the state of bit six.
