= Spillover =

Spillover may refer to:

- Adsorption spillover, a chemical phenomenon involving the movement of atoms adsorbed onto a metal surface
- Catalyst support#Spillover
- Behavioral spillover, the effect that one behavior has on other behaviors with a shared motive
- Hydrogen spillover
- Knowledge spillover, exchange of ideas among individuals
- Spillover (book), or Spillover: Animal Infections and the Next Human Pandemic, a 2012 book by David Quammen
- Spillover (economics), an economic event that occurs because of an event in a seemingly unrelated context
- Spillover (experiment)
- Spillover (imaging), in e.g. tomography, an imaging effect that exaggerates small objects, because of limited resolution
- Spillover infection or pathogen spillover occurs when an infectious reservoir population affects a novel host
- Spillover-crossover model, in psychology distinguishes spillover from crossover as components of transfer of well-being

== See also ==
- Spillover II, an artwork by Jaume Plensa
- Category:Spillover of wars
