= Degradation (telecommunications) =

In telecommunication, degradation is the loss of quality of an electronic signal, which may be categorized as either "graceful" or "catastrophic", and has the following meanings:

1. The deterioration in quality, level, or standard of performance of a functional unit.
2. In communications, a condition in which one or more of the required performance parameters fall outside predetermined limits, resulting in a lower quality of service.

There are several forms and causes of degradation in electric signals, both in the time domain and in the physical domain, including runt pulse, voltage spike, jitter, wander, swim, drift, glitch, ringing, crosstalk, antenna effect (not the same antenna effect as in IC manufacturing), and phase noise.

Degradation usually refers to reduction in quality of an analog or digital signal. When a signal is being transmitted or received, it undergoes changes which are undesirable. These changes are called degradation. Degradation is usually caused by: distance, imitation:see Remote Control, noise, interference or EMI.

In general, interference is a major cause of degradation as it causes loss of clear signals. This can take the form of contrasting signals or congestion of multiple signals in a small area; when signals are being broadcast through satellites, interference can still be an issue. This happens often when desired paths of one signal cross over each other, such as during the process of transmission from ground to satellite.
