= Quadrature =

Quadrature may refer to:

== Mathematics ==
- Quadrature (mathematics), a historic term for the computation of the area of a given plane figure, drawing a square with the same area, an integral or integration
  - Squaring the circle
  - Quadrature of the Parabola
  - Quadrature of the hyperbola
- Numerical integration, calculating the numerical value of a definite integral, is often called "numerical quadrature" or simply "quadrature"
  - Gaussian quadrature, a rule for numerical integration
- Quadrature (differential equations), expressing a differential equation solution in terms of antiderivatives

== Signal processing ==
- Addition in quadrature, combining the magnitude of uncorrelated signals by taking the square root of the sum of their squares
- Quadrature phase, oscillations that are said to be in quadrature if they are separated in phase by 90° (π/2, or 𝜆/4)
- Quadrature component of a composite signal
- Quadrature filter, the analytic signal of a real-valued filter
- Quadrature amplitude modulation (QAM), a modulation method of using both an (in-phase) carrier wave and a 'quadrature' carrier wave that is 90° out of phase with the main, or in-phase, carrier
- Quadrature phase-shift keying (QPSK), a phase-shift keying of using four quadrate points on the constellation diagram, equispaced around a circle

== Science ==
- Optical phase space quadratures, operators which represent the real and imaginary parts of the complex amplitude
- Quadrature (astronomy), the position of a body (moon or planet) such that its elongation is 90° or 270°; i.e., the body-earth-sun angle is 90°

== Other uses ==
- Quadrature encoder, a device that detects mechanical position changes and direction of movement
- Illusionistic ceiling painting, sometimes called quadrature after the Italian term, quadratura
- La Quadrature du Net (Squaring of the Net in French), a French advocacy group that promotes digital rights and freedoms of citizens
- "Quadrature", a song by Squarepusher from the album Just a Souvenir
