= Frequency frogging =

Term in telecommunication

In telecommunications, the term frequency frogging has the following meanings:

1. The interchanging of the frequencies of carrier channels to accomplish specific purposes, such as to prevent feedback and oscillation, to reduce crosstalk, and to correct for a high frequency response slope in the transmission line.
2. In microwave radio relay systems, the alternate use of two frequencies at repeater sites to prevent feedback and oscillation.

Note: Frequency frogging is accomplished by having modulators, which are integrated into specially designed repeaters, translate a low-frequency group to a high-frequency group, and vice versa. A frequency channel will appear in the low group for one repeater section and will then be translated to the high group for the next section because of frequency frogging. This results in nearly constant attenuation with frequency over two successive repeater sections, and eliminates the need for large slope equalization and adjustments. Singing and crosstalk are minimized because the high-level output of a repeater is at a different frequency than the low-level input to other repeaters. It also diminishes group delay distortion. A repeater that receives on the high band from both direction and sends on the low band is called Hi-Lo; the other kind Lo-Hi.
