= Propagation path obstruction =

In telecommunications, a propagation path obstruction is a man-made or natural physical feature that lies near enough to a radio path to cause a measurable effect on path loss, exclusive of reflection effects. An obstruction may lie to the side, above, or below the path. Ridges, bridges, cliffs, buildings, and trees are examples of obstructions. If the clearance from the nearest anticipated path position, over the expected range of Earth radius k-factor, exceeds 0.6 of the first Fresnel zone radius, the feature is not normally considered an obstruction.
