= Normalized frequency =

Normalized frequency may refer to:

- Normalized frequency (signal processing)
- Normalized frequency (fiber optics), also known as V number
