= Power connector =

Power connector may refer to:

- AC power plugs and sockets, devices that allow electrically operated equipment to be connected to the primary alternating current (AC) power supply in a building
  - NEMA connector, the standard for much of the Americas and Japan for such plugs and sockets
- Industrial power plug
- DC connector, an electrical connector for supplying direct current (DC) power
- Blade connector, commonly found in cars for quick connection of wiring to electrical components
- IEC 60309 (BS 4343), so-called "Commando" plug and socket
- IEC 60320, connectors for power supply cords to electrical appliances
- Molex connector, four-pin hard disk drive (HDD) connectors, also used for powering CD-ROM drives, burners etc.
- Berg connector, smaller four pin floppy disk drive (FDD) connectors, also used by some hard drives, and carrying the same power supplies as the HDD connectors

== See also ==
- Electrical connector, an electro-mechanical device for joining electrical circuits as an interface using a mechanical assembly
- RF connector, an electrical connector designed to work at radio frequencies in the multi-megahertz range
