= Pulse-address multiple access =

In telecommunications, pulse-address multiple access (PAMA) is a channel access method that enables the ability of a communication satellite to receive signals from several Earth terminals simultaneously and to amplify, translate, and relay the signals back to Earth, based on the addressing of each station by an assignment of a unique combination of time and frequency slots.

This ability may be restricted by allowing only some of the terminals access to the satellite at any given time.
