= Information-bearer channel =

Type of communication channel

In telecommunications, an information-bearer channel is one of:

1. A communication channel capable of transmitting all the information required for communication, such as user data, synchronizing sequences, and control signals. The information-bearer channel may operate at a higher data rate than that required for user data alone.
2. A basic communications channel with the necessary bandwidth but without enhanced or value-added services.
