= Halftone characteristic =

Characteristic in facsimile systems

In a facsimile system the halftone characteristic is either:

1. the relationship between the density of the recorded copy and the density of the original, or
2. the relationship between the amplitude of the facsimile signal to either the density of the object or the density of the recorded copy when only a portion of the system is under consideration. In an FM facsimile system, an appropriate parameter other than the amplitude is used.

== See also ==
- Halftone
