= Atmospheric waveguide =

An atmospheric waveguide is an atmospheric flow feature that improves the propagation of certain atmospheric waves.

The effect arises because wave parameters such as group velocity or vertical wavenumber depend on mean flow direction and strength. Thus, for instance, westerlies might be a good waveguide for eastward-traveling waves, but might strongly dissipate westward-traveling waves, by increasing or decreasing their vertical wavenumber, respectively. Modification of the waves' group velocity will change their meridional propagation speed, directing them more polewards or more equatorwards.
