= Signal-to-crosstalk ratio =

The signal-to-crosstalk ratio at a specified point in a circuit is the ratio of the power of the wanted signal to the power of the unwanted signal from another channel.

The signals are adjusted in each channel so that they are of equal power at the zero transmission level point in their respective channels.

The signal-to-crosstalk ratio is usually expressed in dB.
