= Tropospheric wave =

Type of radio wave

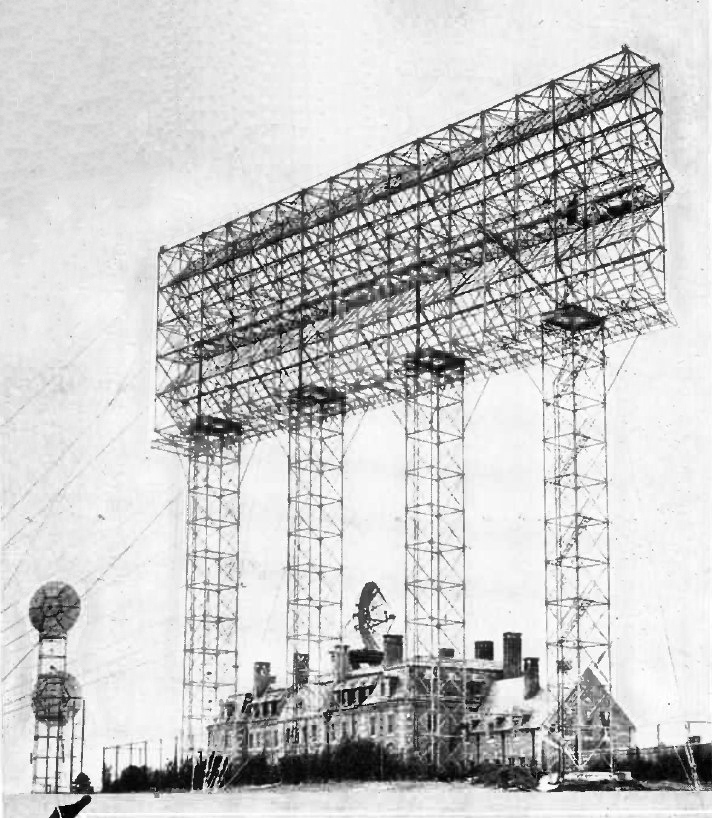
Part of a tropospheric scatter system built in 1955. Before the invention of communications satellites, the U.S. military used tropospheric waves as a method of long-distance communication.

In telecommunications, a tropospheric wave is a radio wave that travels via reflection in the troposphere. Trophospheric waves are propagated from a place of abrupt change in the dielectric constant, or its gradient. In some cases, a ground wave may be so altered that new components appear to arise from reflection in regions of rapidly changing dielectric constant. When these components are distinguishable from the other components, they are called "tropospheric waves."
