= Primary time standard =

In telecommunications, a primary time standard is a time standard that does not require calibration against another time standard.

Examples of primary time, (i.e., frequency standards) are caesium standards and hydrogen masers.

The international second is based on the microwave frequency (9,192,631,770 Hz) associated with the atomic resonance of the hyperfine ground state levels of the caesium-133 atom in a magnetically neutral environment. Realizable caesium frequency standards use a strong electromagnet to deliberately introduce a magnetic field which overwhelms that of the Earth. The presence of this strong magnetic field introduces a slight, but known, increase in the atomic resonance frequency. However, very small variations in the calibration of the electric current in the electromagnet introduce minuscule frequency variations among different caesium oscillators.
