= Radiation mode =

For an optical fiber or waveguide, a radiation mode or unbound mode is a mode which is not confined by the fiber core. Such a mode has fields that are transversely oscillatory everywhere external to the waveguide, and exists even at the limit of zero wavelength.

Specifically, a radiation mode is one for which

$$\beta = \sqrt{n^2(a) k^2 -(l/a)^2}$$

where β is the imaginary part of the axial propagation constant, integer l is the azimuthal index of the mode, n(r) is the refractive index at radius r, a is the core radius, and k is the free-space wave number, k = 2π/λ, where λ is the wavelength. Radiation modes correspond to refracted rays in the terminology of geometric optics.

== See also ==
- Guided ray
- Numerical aperture
- Cladding (fiber optics)
