= Response time =

Response time may refer to:

- The time lag between an electronic input and the output signal which depends upon the value of passive components used.
- Responsiveness, how quickly an interactive system responds to user input
- Response time (biology), the elapsed time from the presentation of a sensory stimulus to the completion of the subsequent behavioral response
- Response time (technology), the time a generic system or functional unit takes to react to a given input
  - Display response time, the amount of time a pixel in a display takes to change
- Round-trip delay time, in telecommunications
- Emergency response time, the amount of time that emergency responders take to arrive at the scene of an incident from the time that the emergency response system was activated
- Search response time or query response time, the time it takes a web server to respond when it receives a query

== See also ==
- Delay (disambiguation)
- Latency (disambiguation)
