= Modulation index =

The modulation index (or modulation depth) of a modulation scheme describes by how much the modulated variable of the carrier signal varies around its unmodulated level. It is defined differently in each modulation scheme.

- Amplitude modulation index
- Frequency modulation index
- Phase modulation index
