= Narrowband modem =

Modem constrained to 4 kHz voice bandwidth

In telecommunications, a narrowband modem is a modem whose modulated output signal has an essential frequency spectrum that is limited to that which can be wholly contained within, and faithfully transmitted through, a voice channel with a nominal 4 kHz bandwidth.

Note: High frequency (HF) modems are limited to operation over a voice channel with a nominal 3 kHz bandwidth.
