= Distortion-limited operation =

Signal-related condition in telecommunications engineering

In telecommunications, distortion-limited operation is the condition prevailing when distortion of a received signal, rather than its attenuated amplitude (or power), limits performance under stated operational conditions and limits.

Note: Distortion-limited operation is reached when the system distorts the shape of the waveform beyond specified limits. For linear systems, distortion-limited operation is equivalent to bandwidth-limited operation.
