= Keying (telecommunications) =

Keying is a family of modulation forms where the modulating signal takes one of a specific (predetermined) number of values at all times. The goal of keying is to transmit a digital signal over an analog channel. The name derives from the Morse code key used for telegraph signaling.

Modulation is the general technique of shaping a signal to convey information. When a digital message has to be represented as an analog waveform, the technique and term keying (or digital modulation) is used. Keying is characterized by the fact that the modulating signal will have a limited number of states (or values) at all times, to represent the corresponding digital states (commonly zero and one, although this might depend on the number of symbols used). This is in contrast to analogue modulation, where an analogue signal is transmitted over an analogue channel, and where the modulated analogue signal will have an infinite number of meaningful states. Furthermore, note that keying or digital modulation applies to transmitting a digital signal over an analogue passband channel. When a digital signal is to be transmitted over an analogue baseband channel, the modulation technique is termed line coding.

Several keying techniques exist, including phase-shift keying, frequency-shift keying, and amplitude-shift keying. Bluetooth, for example, uses phase-shift keying to exchange information between devices.

An overview of keying techniques is given at Modulation § Fundamental digital modulation methods.
