= Busy-hour call attempts =

In telecommunications, busy-hour call attempts (BHCA) is a teletraffic engineering measurement used to evaluate and plan capacity for telephone networks. BHCA is the number of telephone calls attempted at the sliding 60-minute period during which occurs the maximum total traffic load in a given 24-hour period (BHCA), and the higher the BHCA, the higher the stress on the network processors. BHCA is not to be confused with busy hour call completion (BHCC) which measures the throughput capacity of the network. If a bottleneck in the network exists with a capacity lower than the estimated BHCA, then congestion will occur resulting in many failed calls and customer dissatisfaction.

BHCA is usually used when planning telephone switching capacities and frequently goes side by side with the Erlang unit capacity calculation. As an example, a telephone exchange with a capacity of one million BHCA is estimated to handle 250,000 subscribers. The overall calculation is more complex however, and involves accounting for available circuits, desired blocking rates, and Erlang capacity allocated to each subscriber.

== Determination ==
The busy hour is determined by fitting a horizontal line segment equivalent to one hour under the traffic load curve about the peak load point. If the service time interval is less than 60 minutes, the busy hour is the 60-minute interval that contains the service timer interval. In cases where more than one busy hour occurs in a 24-hour period, i.e., when saturation occurs, the busy hour or hours most applicable to the particular situation are used.

== See also ==
- Call volume (telecommunications)
