= User information =

User information is information transferred across the functional interface between a source user and a telecommunications system for delivery to a destination user.

In telecommunications systems, user information includes user overhead information.
