= Drift (telecommunications) =

In telecommunications, a drift is a comparatively long-term change in an attribute, value, or operational parameter of a system or equipment. The drift should be characterized, such as "diurnal frequency drift" and "output level drift." Drift is usually undesirable and unidirectional, but may be bidirectional, cyclic, or of such long-term duration and low excursion rate as to be negligible.

Drift is also common in pseudo-synchronised streaming applications, such as low-latency audio streaming over TCP/IP. Normally both ends of a streaming connection would stay in-sync with a master clock but TCP/IP does not provide this 'master clock' mechanism. Therefore, applications running fixed clocks will drift apart over time and glitches will occur. This is usually fixed by controlling jitter or drift, by slightly altering the clock speed at one end of the connection.

== See also ==
- Clock drift
- Federal Standard 1037C
