= Terminal equipment =

Term used in telecommunication

In telecommunications, the term terminal equipment has the following meanings:

- Communications equipment at either end of a communications link, used to permit the stations involved to accomplish the mission for which the link was established.
- In radio-relay systems, equipment used at points where data are inserted or derived, as distinct from equipment used only to relay a reconstituted signal.
- Telephone and telegraph switchboards and other centrally located equipment at which communications circuits are terminated.

== See also ==
- Customer-premises equipment
- Data terminal equipment, an end instrument that converts user information into signals for transmission or reconverts the received signals into user information
