= Telecommunications facility =

A telecommunications facility is any facility that hosts Telecommunications equipment or services.

== Global telecom facility ==
Globally, a telecommunications facility is a location a service can be offered. Local exchange carriers (ILECs) have hardware to process telecom services. A phone call made to Jamaica can not be processed by a telecom facility in Canada or the US. If a phone number series belongs to an operator or carriers in Jamaica then only that operator knows if that phone number is valid and further whether that phone number can place a valid phone call. All carriers get the signal from the telecom facilities of the Digicel in Jamaica.

== United States ==
It is defined by United States Federal Standard 1037C as:

- A fixed, mobile, or transportable structure, including (a) all installed electrical and electronic wiring, cabling, and equipment and (b) all supporting structures, such as utility, ground network, and electrical supporting structures.
- A network-provided service to users or the network operating administration.
- A transmission pathway and associated equipment.
- In a protocol applicable to a data unit, such as a block or frame, an additional item of information or a constraint encoded within the protocol to provide the required control.
- A real property entity consisting of one or more of the following: a building, a structure, a utility system, pavement, and underlying land.

== Canada ==
Under Canadian federal and Québécois provincial law, a telecommunications facility, for the purposes of determining whether GST applies, is defined by §123(1) of the GST Act to be "any facility, apparatus, or other thing (including any wire, cable, radio, optical, or other electromagnetic system, or any similar technical system or any part thereof) that is used or is capable of being used for telecommunications". This includes equipment spanning satellites and earth stations, telephones and fax machines.
