= User (telecommunications) =

One that uses services provided by a telecommunication system

In telecommunications, a user is a person, organization, or other entity that uses the services provided by a telecommunication system, or by an information processing system, for transfer of information. A user functions as a source or final destination of user information, or both. A user may also be the subscriber, i.e. the customer paying for the service.

A user is also a person or process accessing an automated information system (AIS) by direct connections (e.g., via terminals) or indirect connections. "Indirect connection" relates to persons who prepare input data or receive output that is not reviewed for content or classification by a responsible individual.

== See also ==
- User (computing)
