= MIL-STD-188 =

Series of U.S. military standards relating to telecommunications

Cover of CHQ's commercial reprint of the MIL-STD-188 Military Standards series

MIL-STD-188 is a series of U.S. military standards relating to telecommunications.

== Purpose ==
Faced with "past technical deficiencies in telecommunications systems and equipment and software…that were traced to basic inadequacies in the application of telecommunication standards and to the lack of a well defined…program for their review, control and implementation", the U.S. Department of Defense looked to develop a series of standards that would alleviate the problem.

By 1988, the U.S. Department of Defense (DoD) issued Instruction 4630.8 (reissued in 1992, 2002, 2004) stating its policy that "all forces for joint and combined operations be supported through compatible, interoperable, and integrated Command, Control, Communications, and Intelligence systems. …[and that all such] systems developed for use by U.S. forces are considered to be for joint use." To achieve this the director of the Defense Information Systems Agency (DISA) is charged with "developing information technology standards to achieve interoperability and compatibility…[and ensure that all] systems and equipment shall conform to technical and procedural standards for interface, interoperability, and compatibility".

The MIL-STD-188 standards were created to "address telecommunication design parameters based on proven technologies." To ensure interoperability, DISA made these standards mandatory for use in all new DoD systems and equipment, or major upgrades.

The mandatory use of these standards will aid significantly in achieving standardization and result in improvements in availability, maintainability, reliability, and supportability. This, in turn, will enhance lifecycle configuration management and logistic support with subsequent reductions in life cycle costs.

== Evolution ==
When first developed, Military Standard 188 covered technical standards for tactical and long-haul communications, but as it was revised (MIL-STD-188A, MIL-STD-188B) it became a document applicable to tactical communications only (MIL-STD-188C 24 Nov 1969). The Defense Information Systems Agency published circulars which announced both standards and engineering criteria relating to the long-haul Defense Communications System and to the technical support of the Worldwide Military Command and Control System. In line with a decision by the Joint Chiefs of Staff, these standards are published in the MIL-STD-188 series of documents. This series is subdivided into "a MIL-STD-188-100 series covering common standards for tactical and long-haul communications, a MIL-STD-188-200 series covering standards for tactical communications only, and a MIL-STD-188-300 series covering standards for long-haul communications only."

The MIL-STD-188 series standards are encompassed by the DoD's Joint Technical Architecture.

== Deviations and waivers ==
For any manufacturer seeking to deviate from the MIL–STD-188 series standards (prior to the manufacture of an item) they must request to do so with the Joint Steering Committee (JSC) which is constituted under the Defense Communications Agency. For any DoD Agency to get a waiver to receive an item that deviates from the standards they also must apply to the JSC.

== Relation to other systems of standards ==
According to DoD documents, "The MIL-STD-188 series may be based on, or make reference to, Joint Technical Architecture, American National Standards Institute (ANSI) standards, International Telecommunication Union - Telecommunication Standardization Sector (ITU-T) recommendations, North Atlantic Treaty Organization (NATO) Standardization Agreements (STANAG), and other standards wherever applicable."

== Current development emphasis ==
Currently the DoD is placing its emphasis "on the development of common standards for tactical and long-haul communications (the MIL-STD-188-100 series)."

== Documents ==
Note: The following list of documents are those that are presently active. Documents with three digit numbers followed by a letter of the alphabet indicate that they are revisions of an older version of that document.

=== MIL-STD-188-100 series ===
According to the DoD the MIL-STD-188-100 series contains "technical standards and design objectives which are common to both the long haul and tactical communications systems."

The current articles in this series include:

- 100 - Common Long Haul and Tactical Communication System Technical Standards
- 105 - Interoperability and Performance Standards for the All Digital Tactical-To-Strategic Gateway
- 110D - Interoperability And Performance Standards For Data Modems
- 111A - Interoperability And Performance Standards For Fiber Optic Communications Systems
- 112 - Subsystem Design And Engineering Standards For Common Long Haul Tactical Cable And Wire Communications
- 113 - Interoperability And Performance Standards For Analog- To- Digital Conversion Techniques
- 114A - Electrical Characteristics of Digital Interface Circuits (can interoperate with RS-422 and RS-423, but not identical)
- 115 - Interoperability And Performance Standards For Communications Timing And Synchronization Subsystems
- 116 - Interoperability Standards For Information And Record Traffic Exchange Mode
- 120 - Military Communication System Standards Terms And Definitions
- 124B - Grounding, Bonding And Shielding For Common Long Haul/Tactical Communication Systems Including Ground Based Communications-Electronics Facilities And Equipments
- 125A - High-Altitude Electromagnetic Pulse (HEMP) Protection For Ground-Based Facilities Performing Critical, Time-Urgent Missions
- 136A - Satellite Data Link Standard (SDLS) For EHF Medium Data Rate (MDR) Uplinks And Downlinks
- 140A - Equipment Technical Design Standards For Common Long Haul/Tactical Radio Communications In The Low Frequency Band And Lower Frequency Bands
- 141D - Interoperability and Performance Standards for Medium and High Frequency Radio Systems (includes standards for automatic link establishment)
- 145 - Interoperability And Performance Standards For Digital Line of sight Microwave Radio Equipment
- 146 - Interoperability And Performance Standards For Satellite Communications
- 148B - Interoperability Standard for Anti Jam (AJ) Communications In The High Frequency (2-30 MHz) Band
- 154A - Subsystem, Equipment, And Interface Standards For Common Long Haul And Tactical Telecommunications Control Facilities
- 161D - Interoperability and Performance Standards for Digital Facsimile Equipment
- 164A - Interoperability and Performance Standards for C-Band, X-Band, and Ku-Band SHF Satellite Communications Earth Terminals
- 165A - Interoperability and Performance Standards for SHF Satellite Communications PSK Modems (Fdma Operation)
- 166 - Interface Standard, Interoperability and Performance Standard for SHF SATCOM Link Control
- 167 - Interface Standard, Message Format for SHF SATCOM Link Control
- 168 - Interface Standard, Interoperability and Performance Standards for SHF Satellite Communications Multiplexers and Demultiplexers
- 171 - Interoperability Standards For Information And Record Traffic Exchange Mode I
- 172 - Interoperability Standards For Information And Record Traffic Exchange Mode Ii
- 173 - Interoperability Standards For Information And Record Traffic Exchange Mode V
- 174 - Interoperability Standards For Information And Record Traffic Exchange Mode Vi
- 176 - Standardized Profile For Asynchronous Transfer Mode (ATM)
- 181B - Advanced Narrowband Digital Voice Terminal (ANDVT) and 56 kbit/s data
- 181C - Interoperability Standard For Access To 5-kHz And 25-kHz UHF Satellite Communications Channels
- 182B - Interoperability Standard For UHF SATCOM Demand Assigned Multiple Access (DAMA) Orderwire Messages And Protocols
- 183B - Interoperability Standard For Multiple-Access 5-kHz And 25-kHz UHF Satellite Communications Channels
- 184 - Interoperability and Performance Standard for the Data Control Waveform
- 185 - Interoperability UHF Milsatcom DAMA Control System
- 186 - Interoperability Standard For UHF SATCOM Short-Delay Report-Broadcast Service
- 187 - Interoperability Standard for Mobile User Objective System (MUOS) Terminals
- 190 - Methods for Communication System Measure
- 194 - Integrated Services Digital Network Profile
- 196 - Bi-Level Image Compression for the National Imagery Transmission Format Standard
- 197A - Adaptive Recursive Interpolated Differential Pulse Code Modulation (ARIDPCM) Compression Algorithm For The National Imagery Transmission Format Standard
- 198A - Joint Photographic Experts Group (JPEG) Image Compression for the National Imagery Transmission Format Standard
- 199 - Vector Quantization Decompression for the National Imagery Transmission Format Standard
- 203-1A - Interoperability and Performance Standards for Tactical Digital Information Link (Tadil) A (Link 11)

=== MIL-STD-188-200 series ===
According to the DoD the MIL-STD-188-200 series "contains current tactical communications, technical standards and design objectives…[this series includes] appropriate unclassified design objectives and tactical communications systems technical standards…[and] Appropriate communications-electronics systems standards and design objectives developed under joint projects…[which are] integrated in the tactical communications standards."

The current articles in this segment include:

- 200 - System Design and Engineering Standards For Tactical Communications
- 202 - Interoperability And Performance Standards For Tactical Digital Transmission Groups (Coaxial Cable) For Tactical Communications
- 203 - Interoperability And Performance Standards For Tactical Digital Information Link (TADIL) A
- 212 - Subsystem Design And Engineering Standards For Tactical Digital Information Link (TADIL) B
- 216A - Interoperability Standards For Data Adapter Control Mode
- 220D - Digital Message Transfer Device Subsystems (Combat-net radio)
- 241 - RF Interface Requirements for VHF Frequency Hopping Tactical Radio Systems
- 242 - Interoperability & Performance Standards For Tactical Single Channel Very High Frequency (VHF) Radio Equipment
- 243 - Interoperability And Performance Standards For Tactical Single Channel Ultra High Frequency (UHF) Radio Communications
- 256 - Interoperability And Performance Standards For Digital Signaling And Supervision Of Tactical Communications Systems
- 260 - Design And Engineering Standards For Tactical Terminal Subsystems

=== MIL-STD-188-300 series ===
According to the DoD the MIL-STD-188–300 Series contains "communications system standards and design objectives applicable to the field of long haul and point-to–point communications in support of the Defense Communications System (DCS) and the National Military Command System (NMCS), and also to provide the necessary interface with non-DCS equipment."

The current articles in this series include:

- 300 - Standards For Long Haul Communications System Design Standards Applicable To The Defense Communications System
- 310A - Subsystem Design And Engineering Standards For Technical Control Facilities
- 311 - Technical Design Standards For Frequency Division Multiplexers
- 313 - Subsystem Design And Engineering Standards And Equipment Technical Design Standards For Long-Haul Communications Transversing Microwave Line-of-Sight (LOS) Radio And Tropospheric Scatter Radio
- 315 - Subsystem Design/Engineering & Equipment Technical Design Standards For Wire Systems
- 331 - Interoperability and Performance Standard for Video Teleconferencing
- 340 - Equipment Technical Design Standards for Voice Orderwire Multiplex
- 341 - Non-Diversity Digital Data 2400 bits per second
- 342 - Standards for Long Haul Communications Equipment Technical Design Standards for Voice Frequency Carrier Telegraph (FSK)
- 344 - Non-Diversity Digital Data 1200 bits per second
- 346 - Standards for Long Haul Communications-Equipment Technical Design Standards for Analog End Instruments and Central Office Ancillary Devices
- 347 - Equipment Technical Design Standards for Digital End Instruments and Ancillary Device

== See also ==
- FIELDATA
