= Telecommunication circuit =

Line, conductor, or other conduit by which information is transmitted

A telecommunication circuit is a path in a telecommunications network used to transmit information. Circuits have evolved from generally being built on physical connections between individual hardware cables, as in an analog phone switch, to virtual circuits established over packet switching networks.

== Definitions ==
A telecommunication circuit may be defined as follows:

- The complete path between two terminals over which one-way or two-way communications may be provided.
- An electronic path between two or more points, capable of providing a single or multiple communication channels.
- An electronic closed-loop path among two or more points used for signal transfer.
- The transmission media and any intermediate equipment between data terminal equipment.

In operational terms, a telecommunication circuit may be capable of transmitting information in only one direction (simplex), or it may be bi-directional (duplex). Bi-directional circuits may support half-duplex operation, when only one end of the channel is allowed to transmit at any time, or they may support full-duplex operation where independent simultaneous transmission occurs in both directions.

== Applications ==
Originally, telecommunication circuits transmitted analog signals. Radio stations used them as studio transmitter links (STLs) or as remote pickup unit (RPU) for sound reproduction, sometimes as a backup to other means. Later lines were digital, used in pair-gain applications, such as carrier systems, or in enterprise data networks.

A leased line, private circuit, or dedicated circuit, is a circuit that is dedicated to only one use and is typically not switched at a central office. The opposite is a switched circuit, which can be connected to different paths in a switching center or telephone exchange. Plain old telephone service (POTS) and ISDN telephone lines are switched circuits.

On certain packet switching telecommunication circuits, a virtual circuit may be created while sharing the physical circuit.
