= Signal transmission =

Process of sending or propagating a signal

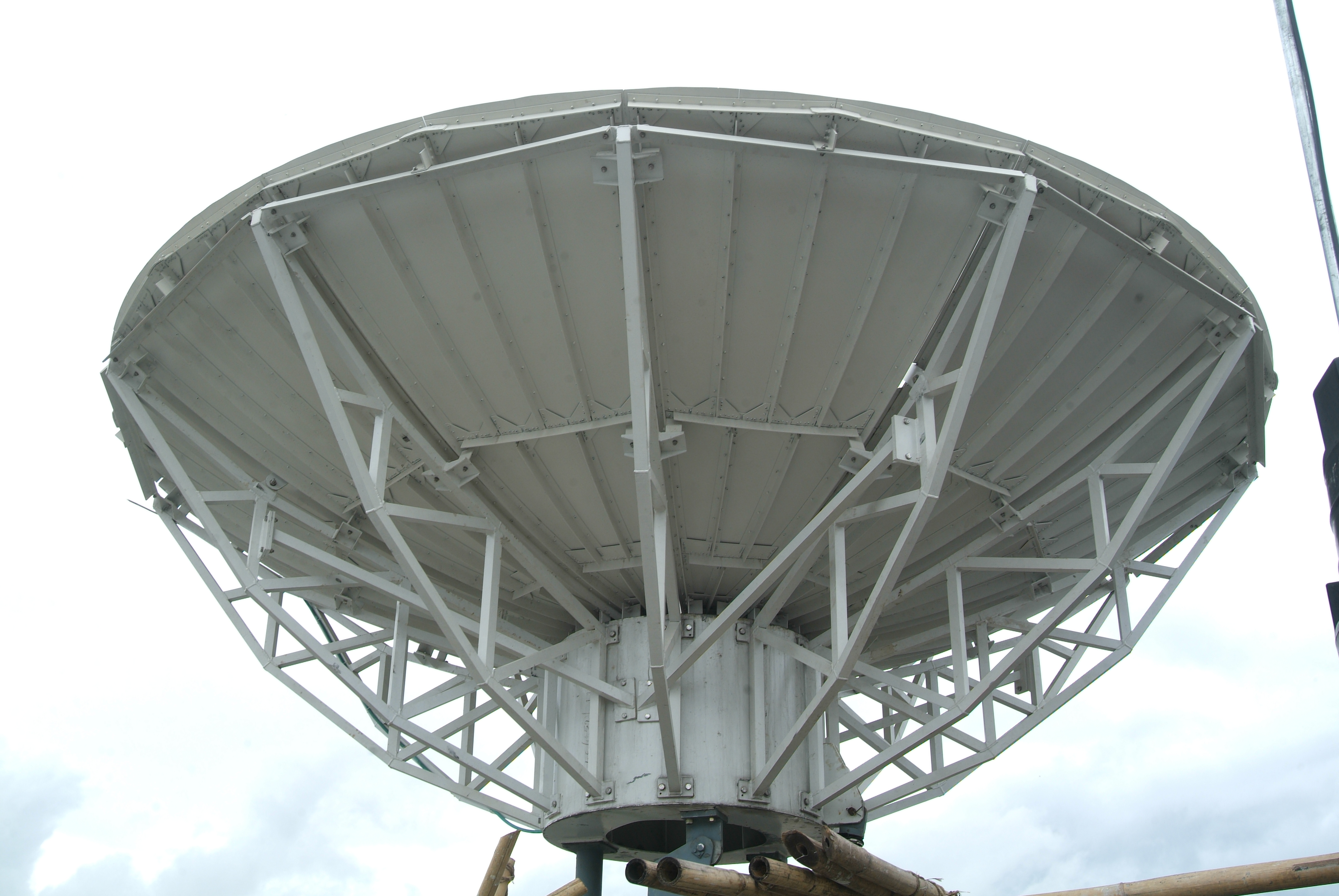
Antenna used for transmission of radio signals

In telecommunications, transmission (sometimes abbreviated as "TX") is the process of sending or propagating an analog or digital signal via a medium that is wired, Wireless, or fiber-optic.

== Etymology ==
The origin of the words transmit and transmission and their derivatives go back to the Latin word transmittere, in turn formed by prefixing the preposition trans (“across or beyond”) and the verb mittere (“to let go or to send”).

== Process ==
Signal transmission is the process of transferring information from one point to another, through different communication systems. These can be: electrical signals, optical signals, radio waves, or other forms of energy.

== See also ==
- Radio transmitter
