= Fukushima nuclear accident casualties =

Possible casualties and related deaths caused by the Fukushima nuclear disaster

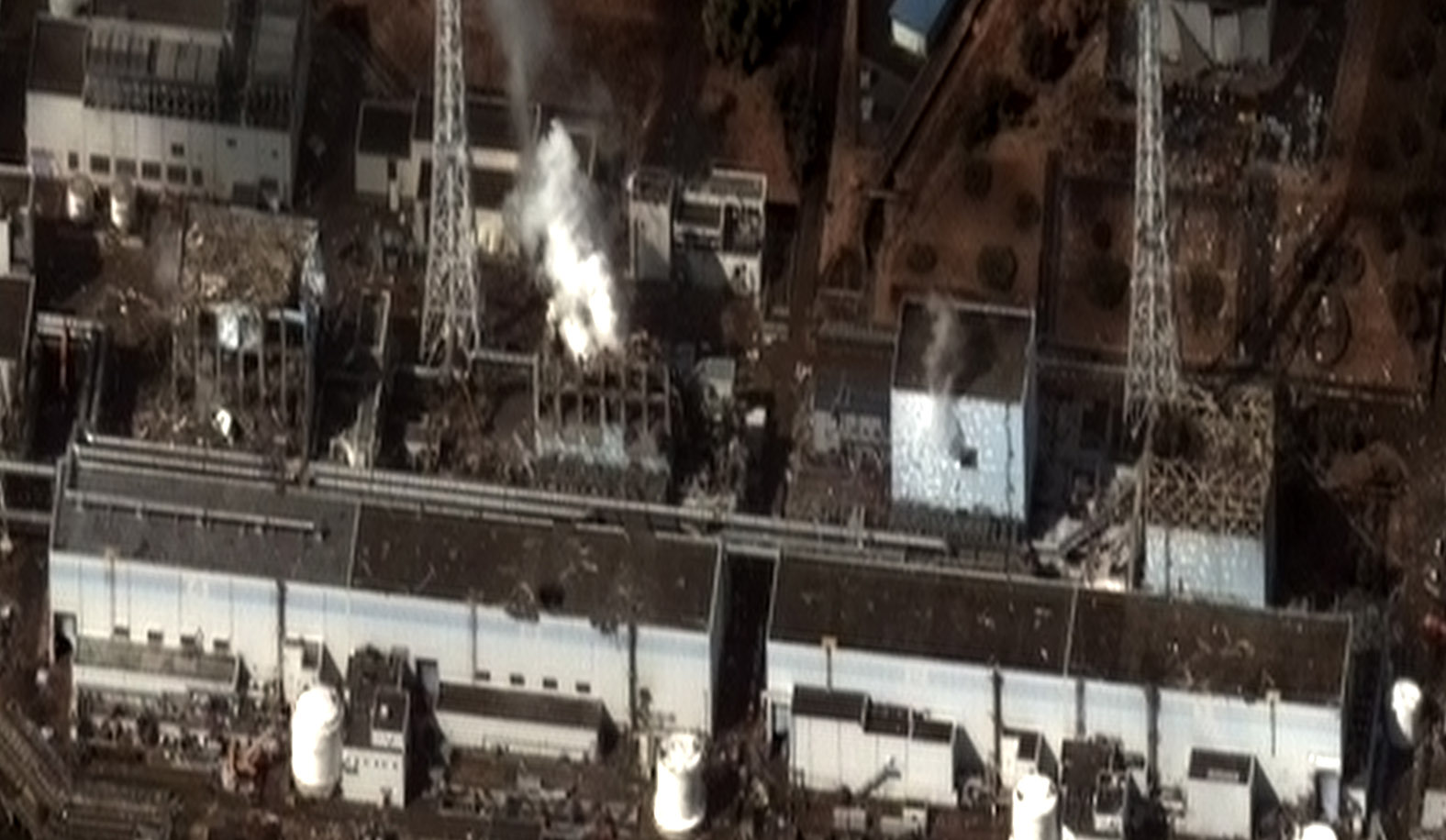
- Satellite image on 16 March 2011 of the four damaged reactor buildings
- Date: 11 March 2011
- Location: Ōkuma, Fukushima, Japan; 37°25′17″N 141°1′57″E
- Outcome: INES Level 7 (ratings by Japanese authorities as of 11 April)
- Deaths: 1 confirmed from radiation (lung cancer, 4 years later), and 2,202 from evacuation.
- Injuries: 6 with cancer or leukemia, 37 with physical injuries, 2 workers taken to hospital with radiation burns

External videos
- 24 hours live camera for Fukushima Daiichi nuclear disaster on YouTube, certified by Tokyo Electric Power Co. Inc.

The Fukushima Daiichi nuclear accident (福島第一原子力発電所事故, Fukushima Dai-ichi genshiryoku hatsudensho jiko) was a series of equipment failures, nuclear meltdowns, and releases of radioactive materials at the Fukushima I Nuclear Power Plant, following the Tōhoku earthquake and tsunami on 11 March 2011. It was the largest nuclear disaster since the Chernobyl disaster of 1986, and the radiation released exceeded official safety guidelines. Despite this, there were no deaths caused by acute radiation syndrome. Given the uncertain health effects of low-dose radiation, cancer deaths cannot be ruled out. However, studies by the World Health Organization and Tokyo University have shown that no discernible increase in the rate of cancer deaths is expected. Predicted future cancer deaths due to accumulated radiation exposures in the population living near Fukushima have ranged in the academic literature from none to hundreds.

Many deaths are attributed to the evacuation and subsequent long-term displacement following emergency mass evacuation. For evacuation, the estimated number of deaths during and immediately after transit ranges from 34 to "greater than 50". The victims include hospital inpatients and elderly people at nursing facilities who died from causes such as hypothermia, deterioration of underlying medical problems, and dehydration. The old people and already sick, were more likely to be injured because of being relocated than damaged by radiation.

For long-term displacement, many people (mostly sick and elderly) died at an increased rate while in temporary housing and shelters. Degraded living conditions and separation from support networks are likely contributing factors. As of 27 February 2017, the Fukushima prefecture government counted 2,129 "disaster-related deaths" in the prefecture. This value exceeds the number that have died in Fukushima prefecture directly from the earthquake and tsunami. "Disaster-related deaths" are deaths attributed to disasters and are not caused by direct physical trauma, but do not distinguish between people displaced by the nuclear disaster compared to the earthquake/tsunami. As of the year 2016, among those deaths, 1,368 have been listed as "related to the nuclear power plant" according to media analysis. Reports have pointed out that many of these deaths may have been caused by the evacuation period being too long, and that residents could have been allowed to return to their homes earlier in order to reduce the total related death toll. According to UNSCEAR, evacuation and sheltering measures to protect the public significantly reduced potential radiation exposures by "a factor of 10".

At least six workers have exceeded lifetime legal limits for radiation and more than 175 (0.7%) have received significant radiation doses. Workers involved in mitigating the effects of the accident do face minimally higher risks for some cancers. According to Japan's Ministry of Health, Labor and Welfare, the government awarded workers' compensation to a man who developed leukemia while working on the Fukushima cleanup in 2015 and has acknowledged that three other Fukushima workers developed leukemia and thyroid cancer after working on the plant cleanup. As of 2020, the total number of cancer and leukemia instances has risen to six cases according to the Tokyo Electric Power Company (TEPCO). In 2018 one worker died from lung cancer as a result from radiation exposure. After hearing opinions from a panel of radiologists and other experts, the ministry ruled that the man's family should be paid compensation.

The Tōhoku earthquake and tsunami killed over 15,000 people from effects unrelated to the destruction of the reactors at Fukushima.

== Summary of events ==
The plant comprises six separate boiling water reactors originally designed by General Electric (GE), and maintained by the Tokyo Electric Power Company (TEPCO). At the time of the quake, Reactor 4 had been de-fueled while 5 and 6 were in cold shutdown for planned maintenance. Immediately after the earthquake, the remaining reactors 1–3 shut down automatically, and emergency generators came online to control electronics and coolant systems. However, the tsunami following the earthquake quickly flooded the low-lying rooms in which the emergency generators were housed. The flooded generators failed, cutting power to the critical pumps that must continuously circulate coolant water through a nuclear reactor for several days to keep it from melting down after being shut down. As the pumps stopped, the reactors overheated due to the normal high radioactive decay heat produced in the first few days after nuclear reactor shutdown (smaller amounts of this heat normally continue to be released for years, but are not enough to cause fuel melting). At this point, only prompt flooding of the reactors with seawater could have cooled the reactors quickly enough to prevent meltdown. Saltwater flooding was delayed because it would ruin the costly reactors permanently. Flooding with seawater was finally commenced only after the government ordered that seawater be used, and at this point, it was already too late to prevent a meltdown.

As the water boiled away in the reactors and the water levels in the fuel rod pools dropped, the reactor fuel rods began to overheat severely, and melt down. In the hours and days that followed, Reactors 1, 2, and 3 experienced full meltdown.

In the intense heat and pressure of the melting reactors, a reaction between the nuclear fuel metal cladding and the remaining water surrounding them produced explosive hydrogen gas. As workers struggled to cool and shut down the reactors, several strongly damaging hydrogen-air chemical explosions occurred.

Concerns about the atmospheric venting of radioactive gasses and the large hydrogen explosion at unit 1 led to a 20 km (12 mi)-radius evacuation around the plant. During the early days of the accident workers were temporarily evacuated at various times for radiation safety reasons. At the same time, seawater that had been exposed to the melting rods was returned to the sea heated and radioactive in large volumes for several months until recirculating units could be put in place to repeatedly cool and reuse a limited quantity of water for cooling. The earthquake damage and flooding in the wake of the tsunami hindered external assistance. Electrical power was slowly restored for some of the reactors, allowing for automated cooling.

Japanese officials initially assessed the accident as Level 4 on the International Nuclear Event Scale (INES) despite the views of other international agencies that it should be higher. The level was later raised to 5 and eventually to 7, the maximum scale value. The Japanese government and TEPCO have been criticized in the foreign press for poor communication with the public and improvised cleanup efforts. On 20 March, the Chief Cabinet Secretary Yukio Edano announced that the plant would be decommissioned once the crisis was over.

On 16 December 2011, Japanese authorities declared the plant stable, although it would take decades to decontaminate the surrounding areas and decommission the plant altogether.

== Radiation release ==
Experts estimate the total amount of radioactivity released into the atmosphere was approximately one-tenth as much as was released during the Chernobyl disaster. Significant amounts of radioactive material have also been released into ground and ocean waters. Measurements taken by the Japanese government 30–50 km from the plant showed caesium-137 levels high enough to cause concern, leading the government to ban the sale of food grown in the area. Tokyo officials temporarily recommended that tap water should not be used to prepare food for infants. In May 2012, TEPCO reported that at least 900 PBq had been released "into the atmosphere in March, 2011 alone".

== Reports ==
=== Japanese government report ===
On 5 July 2012, the parliament appointed The Fukushima Nuclear Accident Independent Investigation Commission (NAIIC) submitted its inquiry report to the Japanese parliament, while the government appointed Investigation Committee on the Accident at the Fukushima Nuclear Power Stations of Tokyo Electric Power Company submitted its final report to the Japanese government on 23 July 2012. Tepco admitted for the first time on 12 October 2012 that it had failed to take stronger measures to prevent disasters for fear of inviting lawsuits or protests against its nuclear plants.

=== UNSCEAR Report ===
Annex A of the UNSCEAR (United Nations Scientific Committee for the Effects of Atomic Radiation) 2013 report to the UN General Assembly states that the average effective dose of the 25,000 workers over the first 19 months after the accident was about 12 millisieverts (mSv). About 0.7% of the workforce received doses of more than 100 mSv (Chapter II A(b) paragraph 35). No radiation-related deaths or acute diseases have been observed among the workers and general public exposed to radiation from the accident (Chapter II A(b) paragraph 38). Adults living in the city of Fukushima were estimated to have received, on average, an effective dose of about 4 mSv (Chapter II A(a) paragraph 30). No discernible increased incidence of radiation-related health effects are expected among exposed members of the public or their descendants (Chapter II A(b) paragraph 39). Average annual exposure in the region from naturally occurring sources is about 2.1 mSv, and average lifetime exposure is 170 mSv (Chapter II A(2) paragraph 29). For comparison, the average dose from an abdominal and pelvic computed tomography (CT) scan, with and without contrast, is 20 to 30 mSv.

=== WHO Report ===
In 2013, two years after the incident, the World Health Organization indicated that the residents of the area who were evacuated were exposed to so little radiation that radiation induced health impacts are likely to be below detectable levels. The health risks in the WHO assessment attributable to the Fukushima radioactivity release were calculated by largely applying the conservative Linear no-threshold model of radiation exposure, a model that assumes even the smallest amount of radiation exposure will cause a negative health effect.

The WHO calculations using this model determined that the most at risk group, infants, who were in the most affected area, would experience an absolute increase in the risk of cancer (of all types) during their lifetime, of approximately 1% due to the accident. With the lifetime risk increase for thyroid cancer, due to the accident, for a female infant, in the most affected radiation location, being estimated to be one half of one percent [0.5%]. Cancer risks for the unborn child are considered to be similar to those in 1 year old infants.

The estimated risk of cancer to people who were children and adults during the Fukushima accident, in the most affected area, was determined to be lower again when compared to the most at risk group – infants. A thyroid ultrasound screening programme is currently[2013] ongoing in the entire Fukushima prefecture, this screening programme is, due to the screening effect, likely to lead to an increase in the incidence of thyroid disease due to early detection of non-symptomatic disease cases. About one third of people [33.3%] in industrialized nations are presently diagnosed with cancer during their lifetimes, radiation exposure can increase one's cancer risk, with the cancers that arise being indistinguishable from cancers resulting from other causes.

No increase is expected in the incidence of congenital or developmental abnormalities, including cognitive impairment attributable to within the womb radiation exposure. As no radiation induced inherited effects/heritable effects, nor teratogenic effects, have ever been definitely demonstrated in humans, with studies on the health of children conceived by cancer survivors who received radiotherapy, and the children of the Hibakusha, not finding a definitive increase in inherited disease or congenital abnormalities. No increase in these effects are therefore expected in or around the Fukushima power plants.

=== Other reports ===
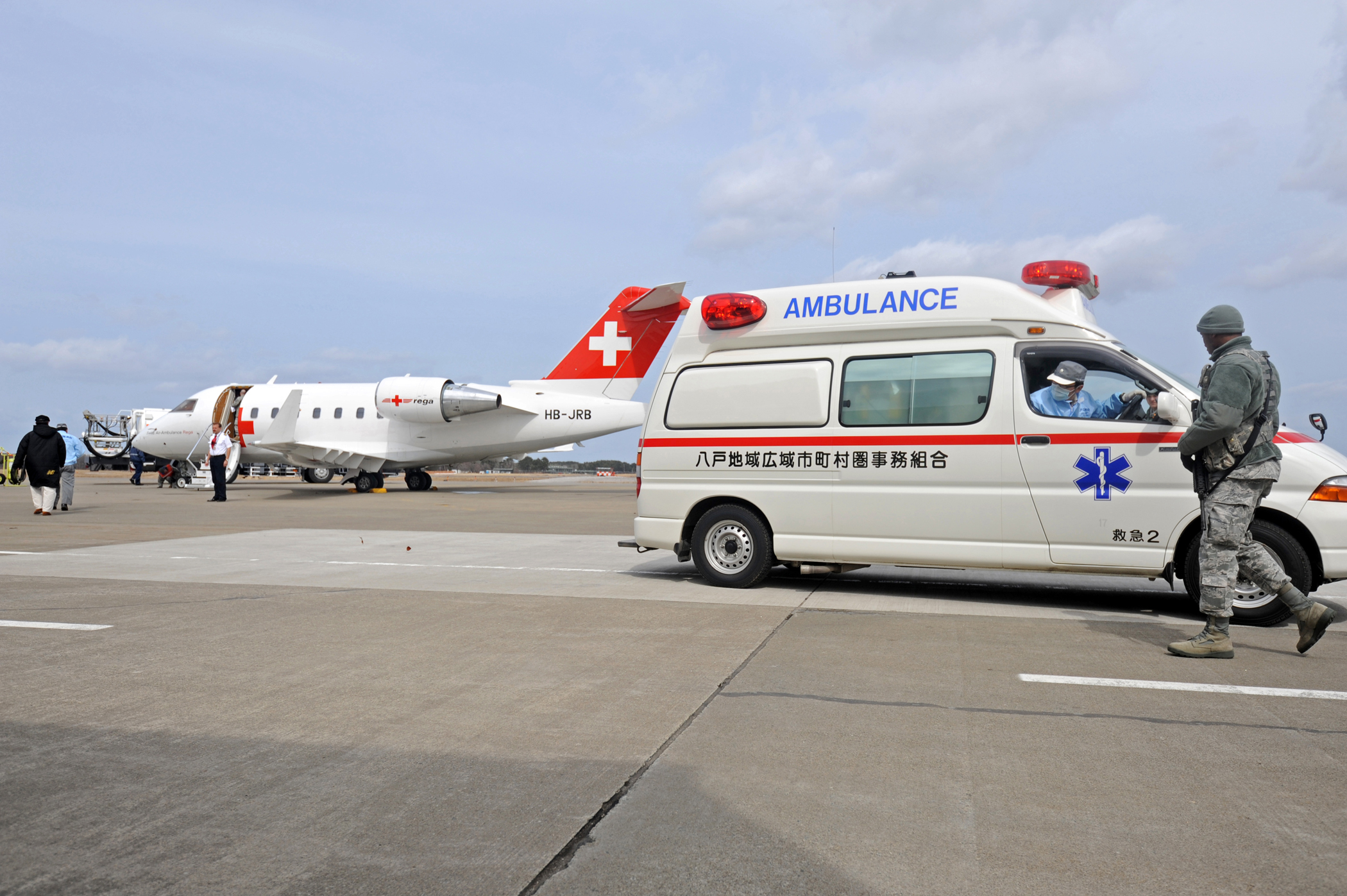
Evacuation flight departs Misawa.

Major news source reporting at least 2 TEPCO employees confirmed dead from "disaster conditions" following the earthquake. "The two workers, aged 21 and 24, sustained multiple external injuries and were believed to have died from blood loss, TEPCO said. Their bodies were decontaminated as radiation has been spewing from the plant for three weeks."

A Japanese Research Company was assigned to find out the health effects and casualties caused by the disaster. They found that some deaths were early, during evacuation processes, while other deaths gradually happened after the disaster. The agency found out that the cause of these early deaths were due to the disruption of hospital operations, exacerbation of pre-existing health problems and the stress of dramatic changes in life. It is stated that the vast majority of people who died during their evacuation were elderly. 45 patients were reported dead after the evacuation of a hospital in Futaba due to lack of food, water and medical care as evacuation was delayed by three days.

The Associated Press reported that fourteen senior citizens died after being moved from their hospital which was in the Fukushima plant evacuation zone.

On 14 April 2011, it was reported that the oldest resident of Iitate, a 102-year-old, committed suicide rather than to leave following the announcement of his village's evacuation.

In a nuclear accident situation it is essential for authorities to understand and communicate the direction that contamination is spreading and where it may be deposited on land. Given this information, as well as basic knowledge of the risks of radiation, residents would not feel unnecessary anxiety.

The wind measurably increased the radiation levels up to 100 miles away from the disaster site. Radioactive iodine, which can lead to increased risk of thyroid cancer if absorbed into the body, was released into the air along with other fission products. To counteract the radioactive iodine the distribution of potassium iodide is used, as it prevents the absorption of the potentially dangerous radioisotopes of that element. Since Chernobyl, distributing potassium iodide to children has been a standard response when risk of radioactivity release is high.

According to the Japanese Government, over 160,000 people in the general population were screened in March 2011 for radiation exposure and no case was found which affects health. Thirty workers conducting operations at the plant had exposure levels greater than 100 mSv.

In April 2011, the United States Department of Energy published projections of the radiation risks over the next year for people living in the neighborhood of the plant. Potential exposure could exceed 20 mSv/year (2 rems/year) in some areas up to 50 kilometers from the plant. That is the level at which relocation would be considered in the US, and it is a level that could cause roughly one extra cancer case in 500 young adults. Natural radiation levels are higher in some part of the world than the projected level mentioned above, and about 4 people out of 10 can be expected to develop cancer without exposure to radiation. Further, the radiation exposure resulting from the accident for most people living in Fukushima is so small compared to background radiation that it may be impossible to find statistically significant evidence of increases in cancer.

As of September 2011, six workers at the Fukushima Daiichi site have exceeded lifetime legal limits for radiation and more than 300 have received significant radiation doses.

Workers on-site now wear full-body radiation protection gear, including masks and helmets covering their entire heads, but it means they have another enemy: heat. As of 19 July 2011, 33 cases of heat stroke had been recorded. In these harsh working conditions, two workers in their 60s have died from heart failure.

As of September 2012, there were no deaths or serious injuries due to direct radiation exposures. Cancer deaths due to accumulated radiation exposures cannot be ruled out, and according to one expert, might be in the order of 100 cases. A May 2012 United Nations committee report stated that none of the six Fukushima workers who had died since the tsunami had died from radiation exposure.

According to a 2012 Yomiuri Shimbun survey, 573 deaths have been certified as "disaster-related" by 13 municipalities affected by the Fukushima nuclear disaster. These municipalities are in the no-entry, emergency evacuation preparation or expanded evacuation zones around the crippled Fukushima nuclear plant. A disaster-related death certificate is issued when a death is not directly caused by a tragedy, but by "fatigue or the aggravation of a chronic disease due to the disaster".

According to a June 2012 Stanford University study by John Ten Hoeve and Mark Z. Jacobson, based on linear no-threshold (LNT) model, the radioactivity released could cause 130 deaths from cancer (the lower bound for the estimator being 15 and the upper bound 1100) and 180 cancer cases (the lower bound being 24 and the upper bound 1800), mostly in Japan. Radiation exposure to workers at the plant was projected to result in 2 to 12 deaths. The radioactivity released was an order of magnitude lower than that released from Chernobyl, and some 80% of the radioactivity from Fukushima was deposited over the Pacific Ocean; preventive actions taken by the Japanese government may have substantially reduced the health impact of the radioactivity release. An additional approximately 600 deaths have been reported due to non-radiological causes such as mandatory evacuations. Evacuation procedures after the accident may have reduced deaths from radiation by between 3 and 245 cases, the best estimate being 28; even the upper bound projection of the lives saved from the evacuation is lower than the number of deaths already caused by the evacuation itself.

These numbers are very low compared to the estimated 20,000 casualties caused by the tsunami itself, and it has been estimated that if Japan had never adopted nuclear power, accidents and pollution from coal or gas plants would have caused more lost years of life.

Finally, there has been a widely critiqued paper published by members of the controversial Radiation and Public Health Project which attempts to ascribe the natural annual cycle of rising and falling adult and infant mortality rates in the United States to Fukushima fallout, suggesting about 14,000 have died. Those who have responded to this paper in the literature have noted a number of errors, among them that this figure was based on an assumption of acute deaths from low radiation doses. There is no known mechanism for this, and "the cities under study with the lowest radiation fallout have the highest increases of death rates in the 14 weeks following Fukushima, while the Californian cities that would have received larger doses saw a decrease in death rate growth" and concluded that "innumerable factors other than radiation" were likely responsible for the major part of the variation in US mortality around the time of the nuclear disaster.

The author of the initial paper which attempts to draw a link between infant mortality in the US and the Fukushima accident, Joseph Mangano and his colleague Ernest J. Sternglass, both of the Radiation and Public Health Project, were also active publishing work attempting to draw a causality between infant death rates in Pennsylvania due to the Three Mile Island accident(TMI-2) in 1979, but likewise, these earlier papers conclusions have failed to be corroborated by any other peer reviewed paper or follow up epidemiology study, with Sternglass's paper being widely critiqued. In their final 1981 report, the Pennsylvania Department of Health, examining death rates within the 10-mile area around TMI for the 6 months after the accident, said that the TMI-2 accident did not cause local deaths of infants or fetuses.

Another cause of death is the increased number of suicides due to mental stress, despair, anxiety and depression caused by media coverage, and through long periods of evacuation.

Perinatal mortality in areas contaminated with radioactive substances started to increase 10 months after the nuclear accident relative to the prevailing and stable secular downward trend. These results are consistent with findings in Europe after Chernobyl. Ten months after the earthquake and tsunami and the subsequent nuclear accident, perinatal mortality in 6 severely contaminated prefectures jumped up from January 2012 onward: jump odds ratio 1.156; 95% confidence interval (1.061, 1.259), P-value 0.0009. There were slight increases in areas with moderate levels of contamination and no increases in the rest of Japan. In severely contaminated areas, the increases of perinatal mortality 10 months after Fukushima were essentially independent of the numbers of dead and missing due to the earthquake and the tsunami.

== See also ==
- List of civilian nuclear accidents
- Lists of nuclear disasters and radioactive incidents
- Timeline of the Fukushima Daiichi nuclear disaster
- Comparison of Fukushima and Chernobyl nuclear accidents
