= Index of radiation articles =

- absorbed dose
- Electromagnetic radiation
- equivalent dose
- hormesis
- Ionizing radiation
- Louis Harold Gray (British physicist)
- rad (unit)
- radar
- radar astronomy
- radar cross section
- radar detector
- radar gun
- radar jamming
- (radar reflector) corner reflector
- radar warning receiver
- (Radarange) microwave oven
- radiance
- (radiant: see) meteor shower
- radiation
- Radiation absorption
- Radiation acne
- Radiation angle
- radiant barrier
- (radiation belt: see) Van Allen radiation belt
- Radiation belt electron
- Radiation belt model
- Radiation Belt Storm Probes
- radiation budget
- Radiation burn
- Radiation cancer
- (radiation contamination) radioactive contamination
- Radiation contingency
- Radiation damage
- Radiation damping
- Radiation-dominated era
- Radiation dose reconstruction
- Radiation dosimeter
- Radiation effect
- radiant energy
- Radiation enteropathy
- (radiation exposure) radioactive contamination
- Radiation flux
- (radiation gauge: see) gauge fixing
- radiation hardening
- (radiant heat) thermal radiation
- radiant heating
- radiant intensity
- radiation hormesis
- radiation impedance
- radiation implosion
- Radiation-induced lung injury
- Radiation Laboratory
- radiation length
- radiation mode
- radiation oncologist
- radiation pattern
- radiation poisoning (radiation sickness)
- radiation pressure
- radiation protection (radiation shield) (radiation shielding)
- radiation resistance
- Radiation Safety Officer
- radiation scattering
- radiation therapist
- radiation therapy (radiotherapy)
- (radiation treatment) radiation therapy
- (radiation units: see) Category:Units of radiation dose
- (radiation weight factor: see) equivalent dose
- radiation zone
- radiative cooling
- radiative forcing
- radiator
- radio
- (radio amateur: see) amateur radio
- (radio antenna) antenna (radio)
- radio astronomy
- radio beacon
- (radio broadcasting: see) broadcasting
- radio clock
- (radio communications) radio
- radio control
- radio controlled airplane
- radio controlled car
- radio-controlled helicopter
- radio controlled model
- (radio controlled plane) model aircraft (see under Powered models)
- (radio crystal oscillator) crystal oscillator
- (radio detection and ranging) radar
- radio direction finder (RDF)
- radio electronics
- Radio Emergency Associated Communication Teams
- radio equipment
- radio fingerprinting
- radio fix
- radio frequency (RF)
- radio frequency engineering
- radio frequency interference (RFI)
- (radio galaxy: see) active galaxy
- (radio ham: see) amateur radio
- (radio history) history of radio
- radio horizon
- radio identification tag
- radio jamming
- radio masts and towers
- (radio mesh network) wireless mesh network
- radio navigation
- radio noise source
- radio propagation
- (radio pulsar: see) rotation-powered pulsar
- (radio receiver) receiver (radio)
- (radio relay link: see) microwave radio relay
- (radio scanner) scanner (radio)
- radio source
- radio source SHGb02 plus 14a
- (radio spectrum: see) radio frequency
- radio spectrum pollution
- radio star
- radio station
- Radio Technical Commission for Aeronautics (RTCA)
- (radio telegraphy) wireless telegraphy
- (radio telephone) radiotelephone
- radio telescope
- radioteletype (RTTY)
- (radio tower: see) radio masts and towers
- (radio translator) broadcast translator
- (radio transmission) transmission (telecommunications)
- (radio transmitter: see) transmitter
- (radio tube triode: see) vacuum tube (thermionic valve)
- (radio tuner) tuner (radio)
- (radio wave: see) radio frequency (RF)
- radio window
- radio-frequency induction
- (radio-jet X-ray binary: see) microquasar
- (radio-to-radio: see) repeater
- (radioactive boy scout) David Hahn
- (radioactive cloud: see) nuclear fallout
- radioactive contamination (radioactive exposure)
- (radioactive dating) radiometric dating
- radioactive decay
- radioactive decay path
- (radioactive dust: see) nuclear fallout
- (radioactive exposure) radioactive contamination
- Radioactive Incident Monitoring Network (RIMNET) (in the UK)
- (radioactive isotope) radionuclide
- radioactive quackery
- (radioactive radiation: see) radiation
- radioactive tracer
- radioactive waste
- (radioactivity) radioactive decay
- (radioastronomy) radio astronomy
- radiobiology
- (radiocarbon) carbon-14
- radiocarbon dating (radiocarbon test)
- radiocarbon revolution
- radiocarbon year
- radiochemistry
- (radiocommunication: see) radio
- Radiocommunications Agency
- radiocontrast
- radiodensity
- radiodetermination
- radiofax (HF Fax)
- (radiofluorescence) radioluminescence
- (radiofrequency) radio frequency
- radiogenic
- radiographer
- radiohalo
- radioimmunoassay
- (radioiodine) iodine-131
- (radioisotope) radionuclide
- radioisotope thermoelectric generator (RTG)
- radioisotope heater units
- radioisotope rocket
- radioisotopic labelling
- radioligand
- radiolocation
- Radiological and Environmental Sciences Laboratory
- (radiological bomb) radiological weapon
- (radiological dispersal device) dirty bomb
- (Radiological Dispersion Device) radiological weapon
- Radiological Protection Institute of Ireland (RPII)
- Radiological Society of North America
- radiological warfare
- radiological weapon (radiological dispersion device [RDD])
- radiology
- Radiology Information System (RIS)
- (radiolucent: see) radiodensity
- radioluminescence (radiofluorescence)
- radiolyse
- radiometer
- (radiometric: see) radiometry
- radiometric dating
- radiometry
- (radionavigation) radio navigation
- radionuclide
- (radionuclide computed tomography) single-photon emission computed tomography (SPECT)
- (radionuclide test: see) nuclear medicine
- radiodensity
- radiopharmaceutical
- radioresistant
- radiosensitivity
- radiosity
- radiosonde
- (radiostation) radio station
- radiosurgery
- (radiotelegraphy) telegraphy
- radiotelephone
- (radiotelescope) radio telescope
- radioteletype (RTTY)
- (radiotherapy) radiation therapy
- (radiothermal generator) radioisotope thermal generator
- (radiotoxic: see) ionizing radiation
- radium
- Radium, Colorado
- radium chloride
- Radium Girls
- Radium Hot Springs, British Columbia
- radon
- radon difluoride (see same for "radon fluoride")
- relative biological effectiveness (RBE)
- Röntgen (unit) (roentgen) (symbol R)
- röntgen equivalent man (rem)
- sievert (symbol: Sv) (unit of dose equivalent)

== See also ==
- list of environment topics
- List of radio propagation topics
