= Jay M. Gould =

American mathematician

Jay Martin Gould (August 19, 1915 – September 16, 2005), was an economist, businessman, statistician and epidemiologist who cofounded the Radiation and Public Health Project in 1989. It was Gould's contention that radiation from nuclear power plants was causing high rates of cancer in surrounding neighborhoods. For more than two decades, Gould routinely warned that low levels of radiation from nuclear reactors were far more dangerous than commonly believed. But his research was criticized by many in the scientific community as being alarmist.

In 1996, Gould published the book The Enemy Within: The High Cost of Living Near Nuclear Reactors.

== Early life and career ==
Gould was born in Chicago in 1915 and raised in New York. He earned his bachelor's degree from Brooklyn College and his doctorate from Columbia University. He was originally an economist, specializing in antitrust and input-output economics. Gould was an early adopter of information technology in economic applications in the 1960s and 1970s. He co-founded Economic Information Systems, Inc. (EIS), which assembled and computerized one of the largest economic information databases of its time, used primarily for marketing and market share analysis. EIS was sold to the Control Data Corporation in 1982. Gould applied many of the same regional analytic and statistical approaches used at EIS in his later work on radiation and public health issues. He was a member of the United States Environmental Protection Agency (EPA) Science Advisory Board under President Carter.

== Publications ==
=== Articles ===
The following is a partial list of articles authored or co-authored by Jay Martin Gould.

- Mangano, Joseph J.; Gould, Jay M.; Sternglass, Ernest J.; Sherman, Janette D.; McDonnell, William (2003). "An unexpected rise in strontium-90 in US deciduous teeth in the 1990s". Science of the Total Environment. 317 (1–3): 37–51. Bibcode:2003ScTEn.317...37M. doi:10.1016/S0048-9697(03)00439-X. PMID 14630411.

=== Books ===
The following is a partial list of books authored or co-authored by Gould. Where possible, the date indicated in parentheses is the date of the first edition.

- Gould, Jay M. (1966). The Technical Elite, New York: Augustus M. Kelley. 178 pages.
- Gould, Jay M. & Goldman, Benjamin A. (1990). With Kate Millpointer. Deadly Deceit: Low-Level Radiation, High-Level Cover-Up, New York: Four Walls Eight Windows, February 1993, ISBN 978-0-941423-35-9 . 222 pages. Second edition: 1991, xiv + 266 pages. ISBN 0-941423-35-2, ISBN 0-941423-56-5. Amazon indicates a 1993 edition (3rd?) of 300 pages. A page devoted to the co-author Benjamin A. Goldman, indicates that there exist editions of this title in German (1991), Russian (1993) and Japanese (1994). The current German-language Wikipedia article on Jay M. Gould indicates the date of the German-language publication as 1996 under the title Tödliche Täuschung Radioaktivität.
- Gould, Jay M. (1996). The Enemy Within: The High Cost of Living Near Nuclear Reactors, New York: Four Walls Eight Windows, 17 July 1996, ISBN 978-1-56858-066-1 [The enemy within: the high cost of living near nuclear reactors : breast cancer, AIDS, low birthweights, and other radiation-induced immune deficiency effects]. 346 pages.

== See also ==
- Index of radiation articles
- Ernest Sternglass
