= Eric Reiss =

American information architect

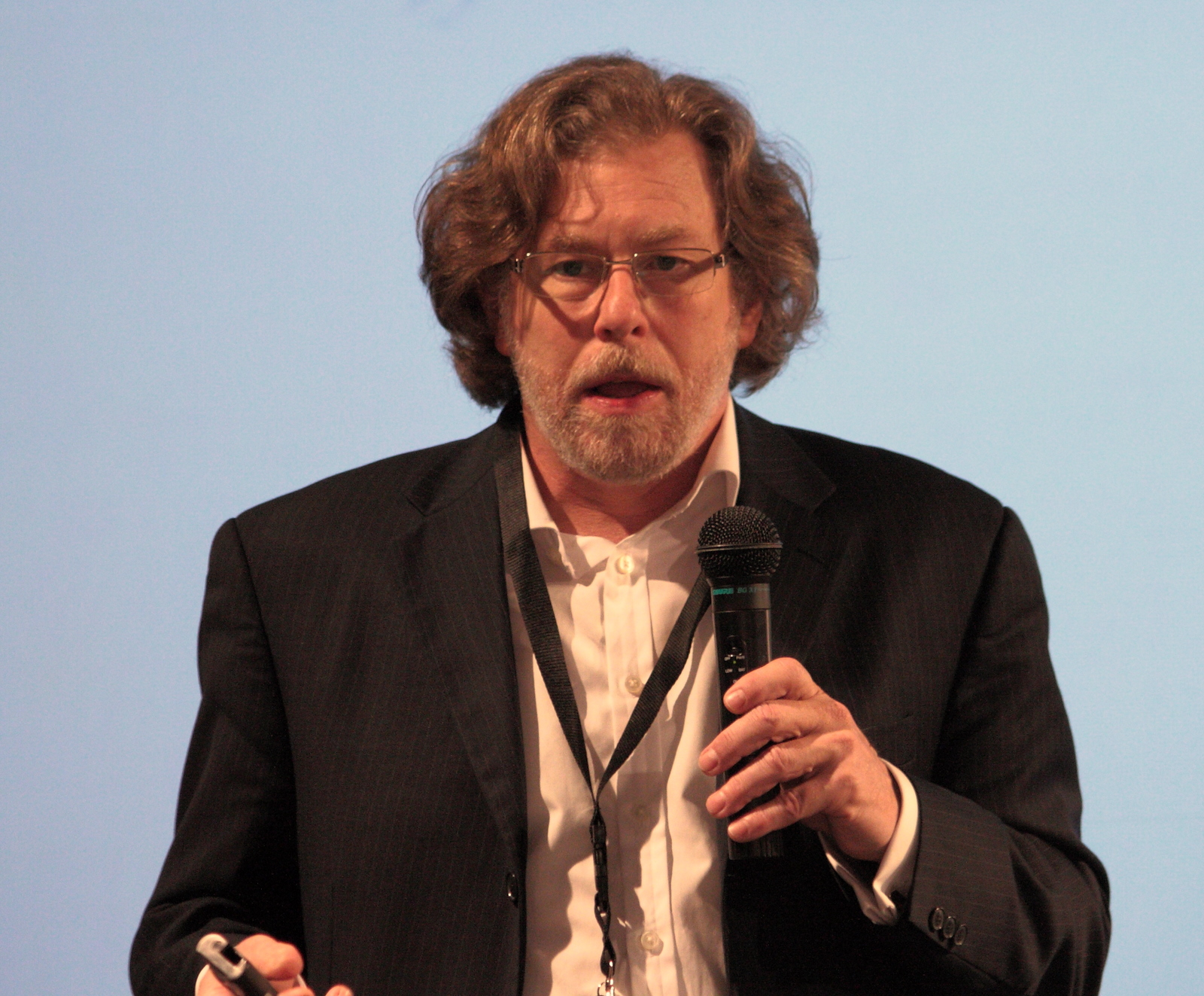
Eric Reiss in 2010

Eric Reiss (born 1954; died July 2025 ) was an American business and information architecture theorist, consultant and author, known for his work in the field of information architecture, usability, and service design. In 2010, he was named in a blog as "One of the Top 10 European Content Strategists to Watch".

== Biography ==
=== Early life and education ===
Born in San Antonio, Texas in 1954, his family relocated to St. Louis prior to his first birthday when his father accepted a position at Washington University School of Medicine. Reiss is the son of two prominent physicians who played pivotal roles in bringing about the nuclear test-ban treaty of 1963 (see Linus Pauling "Activism"). His Viennese-born father, Eric Reiss, M.D., performed early and groundbreaking research on parathyroid hormone (PTH). His mother, Louise Zibold Reiss, M.D., was the director of the Baby Tooth Survey, which collected baby teeth to demonstrate that radioactive Strontium-90, traceable to fallout from above-ground nuclear explosions, had entered the U.S. food chain. His family moved to the Chicago suburb of Highland Park in 1964. He was active in theatre and the performing arts while at Highland Park High School from 1968–1972. During this time, Reiss started restoring player pianos and jukeboxes. He formed his first company, Reiss Player Piano Service, at age 16.

Reiss returned to St. Louis to study at Washington University in St. Louis in 1972. A ragtime pianist, Reiss was Musical Director on the Goldenrod Showboat on the Mississippi River levee during much of 1975, where he also participated in the National Ragtime Festival along with Trebor Tichenor, Dave Jason, Terry Waldo, and the Black Eagle Jazz Band. In 1976, he received his BA degree, having studied Performing Arts and Political Science.

=== Career in Scandinavian theater world ===
After his graduation, Eric Reiss moved to Copenhagen, Denmark to become a stage director at the Royal Danish Theatre. He was originally apprenticed in the fall of 1976 to Danish director Sam Besekow, where he assisted with the production of Eduardo De Filippo's play Saturday, Sunday, Monday. In early 1977, Reiss was granted full director status by the theater. In 1977, his original play, Marionettes, was awarded first prize at the Illinois One-Act Play Festival.

Reiss had a 10-year career in the Scandinavian theater world, published the first Danish-language adventure game (Skabet), and had a short stint studying Egyptology. In 1986, he migrated from theater to professional writing. He wrote his first book, The Compleat Talking Machine, about vintage sound recording and playback devices.

=== Career in business-to-business communications ===
Starting in 1986, Reiss worked almost exclusively in developing business-to-business communications materials and marketing strategies.

With the advent of PC-based multimedia in the late 80s and the World Wide Web a few years later, Reiss combined his knowledge of theater, communication, and computers to build interactive business tools. In early 1997, he developed an on-line communications concept for his employer, Cross-Border Communications. The resulting microsite, Rick's Café, was an interactive precursor to a blog and was subsequently voted Macromedia Site of the Week.

Reiss was CEO of the Copenhagen-based FatDUX Group ApS, which designs online and offline interactive experiences. He is a past president of the Information Architecture Institute, served as Chair of the European Information Architecture Summit - EuroIA from 2005-2014, and is on the Advisory Board of the Copenhagen Business School (Department of Informatics) and the Romanian Institute of Information Architecture. Between 2009-2011, Reiss was an Associate Professor of Usability and Design at IE Business School (formerly Instituto de Empresa) in Madrid, Spain, where he received several awards for his teaching, including the "Best Professor" prize in 2009.

== Personal life ==
Reiss was a performer and musician, working regularly with Vivienne McKee's London Toast Theatre in Copenhagen. He was also a regular on the MTV-produced candid-camera show, Rent Fup, during the season 1998–1999. Other acting credits include the Danish film Miraklet i Valby (1989) and off-screen dubbing for Lars von Trier's Dancer in the Dark (2000).

Reiss and his wife Dorthe made their home in Copenhagen, Denmark. He holds citizenship from Denmark, Germany, and the United States.

== Work ==
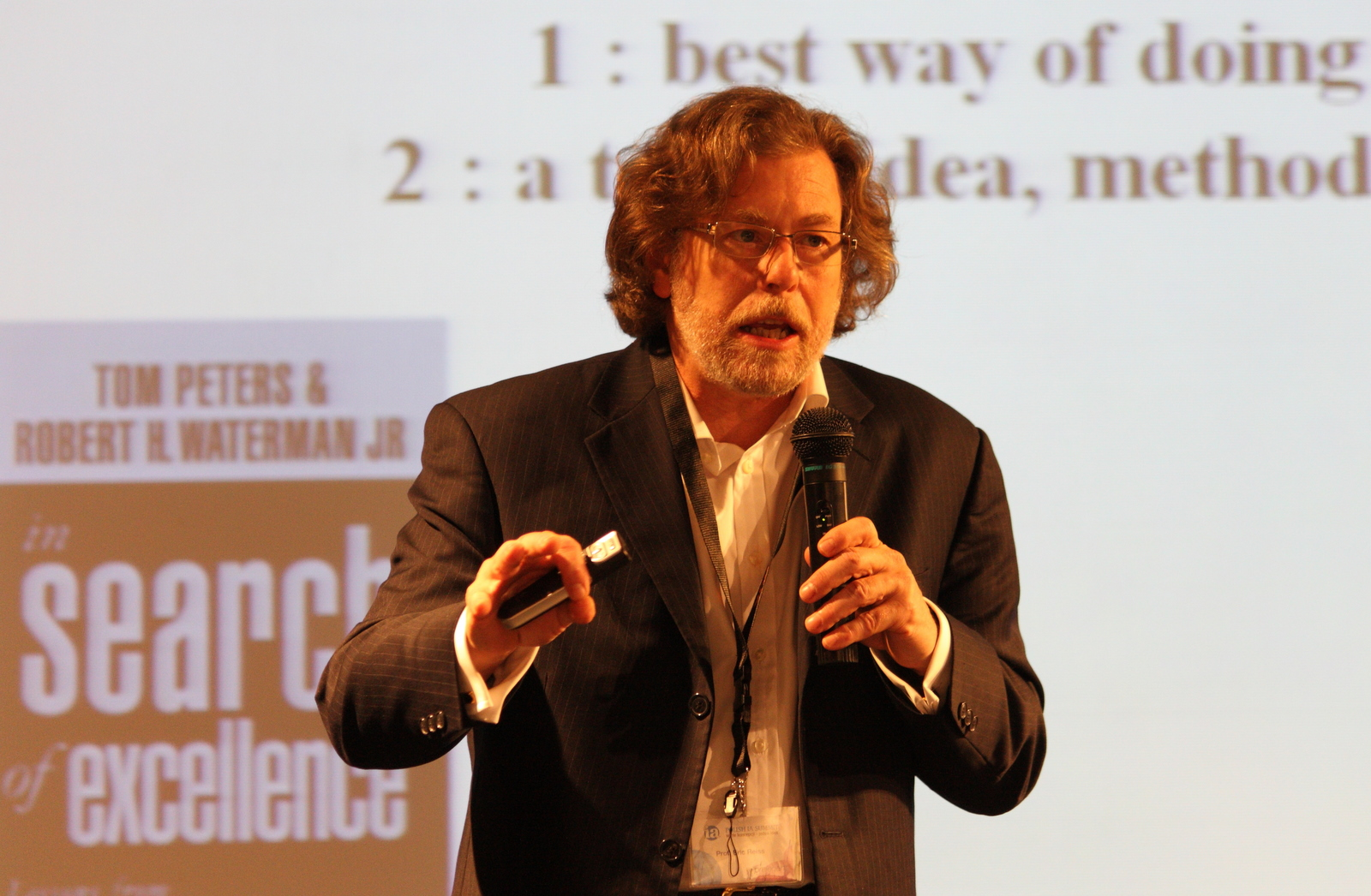
Eric Reiss at Polish IA Summit Warsaw, 2010.

Reiss was the author of Practical Information Architecture (ISBN 0-201-72590-8), Web Dogma '06. and Usable Usability (ISBN 978-1118185476). He also contributed to several other books and publications, including Designing Web Navigation (ISBN 978-0-596-52810-2), Pervasive Information Architecture (ISBN 978-0123820945), Designing the Conversation (ISBN 0-321-88672-0), Speaker Camp (ISBN 0-321-96112-9) and commentary to the online Encyclopedia of Human-Computer Interaction.

== Selected publications ==
- Reiss, Eric L. The compleat talking machine: a guide to the restoration of antique phonographs, 1986.
- Reiss, Eric L. Practical information architecture: a hands-on approach to structuring successful websites. Pearson Education, 2000.
- Reiss, Eric. Usable usability: simple steps for making stuff better. John Wiley & Sons, 2012.

Articles, a selection:

- Reiss, Eric. "IA column: It's not what you think, but how you think." Bulletin of the American Society for Information Science and Technology 34.3 (2008): 47-50.
