= Three Mile Island accident health effects =

Health effects caused by the Three Mile Island accident

The effects of the 1979 Three Mile Island nuclear accident are widely agreed to be very low by scientists in the relevant fields. The American Nuclear Society concluded that average local radiation exposure was equivalent to a chest X-ray and maximum local exposure equivalent to less than a year's background radiation. The U.S. BEIR report on the Biological Effects of Ionizing Radiation states that "the collective dose equivalent resulting from the radioactivity released in the Three Mile Island accident was so low that the estimated number of excess cancer cases to be expected, if any were to occur, would be negligible and undetectable." A variety of epidemiology studies have concluded that the accident has had no observable long term health effects. One dissenting study is "A re-evaluation of cancer incidence near the Three Mile Island nuclear plant" by Dr Steven Wing of the University of North Carolina. In this study, Dr Wing and his colleagues argue that earlier findings had "logical and methodological problems" and conclude that "cancer incidence, specifically lung cancer and leukemia, increased following the TMI accident in areas estimated to have been in the pathway of radioactive plumes than in other areas." Other dissenting opinions can be found in the Radiation and Public Health Project, whose leader, Joseph Mangano, has questioned the safety of nuclear power since 1985.

== Initial investigations ==
In the aftermath of the accident, the investigations focused on the amounts of radioactivity released by the accident. American Nuclear Society explained using the official radioactivity emission figures that "the average radiation dose to people living within ten miles of the plant was eight millirem, and no more than 100 millirem to any single individual. Eight millirem is about equal to a chest X-ray, and 100 millirem is about a third of the average background level of radiation received by US residents in a year". To put this dose into context, while the average background radiation in the US is about 360 millirem per year, the Nuclear Regulatory Commission regulates all workers' of any US nuclear power plant exposure to radiation to a total of 5000 millirem per year. Based on these low emission figures, early scientific publications on the health effects of the fallout estimated one or two additional cancer deaths in the 10-mile area around TMI.

=== Worker overexposures ===
In the early days of the accident, three plant workers were known to have received extremity doses from entries into the Unit 2 auxiliary building. Ron Fountain, an auxiliary operator, hyperventilated while opening sample lines on March 28. The following day, chemistry supervisor Ed Houser and radiation protection foreman Pete Velez received extremity doses while drawing a boron concentration sample from the health-physics lab inside the auxiliary building.

=== Local resident reports ===
The official figures are too low to account for the acute health effects reported by some local residents and documented in two books; such health effects require exposure to at least 100,000 millirems (100 rems) to the whole body - 1000 times more than the official estimates. The reported health effects are consistent with high doses of radiation, and comparable to the experiences of cancer patients undergoing radio-therapy but have many other potential causes. The effects included "metallic taste, erythema, nausea, vomiting, diarrhea, hair loss, deaths of pets, farm and wild animals, and damage to plants." Some local statistics showed dramatic one-year changes among the most vulnerable: "in Dauphin County, where the Three Mile Island plant is located, the 1979 death rate among infants under one year represented a 28 percent increase over that of 1978, and among infants under one month, the death rate increased by 54 percent." Physicist Ernest Sternglass, a specialist in low-level radiation, noted these statistics in the 1981 edition of his book Secret Fallout: low-level radiation from Hiroshima to Three-Mile Island. In their final 1981 report, however, the Pennsylvania Department of Health, examining death rates within the 10-mile area around TMI for the 6 months after the accident, said that the TMI-2 accident did not cause local deaths of infants or fetuses.

Scientific work continued in the 1980s, but focused heavily on the mental health effects due to stress, as the Kemeny Commission had concluded that this was the sole public health effect. A 1984 survey by a local psychologist of 450 local residents, documenting acute radiation health effects (as well as 19 cancers 1980-84 amongst the residents against an expected 2.6), ultimately led the TMI Public Health Fund reviewing the data and supporting a comprehensive epidemiological study by a team at Columbia University.

== Columbia epidemiological study ==
In 1990-91 a Columbia University team, led by Maureen Hatch, carried out the first epidemiological study on local death rates before and after the accident, for the period 1975-1985, for the 10-mile area around TMI. Assigning fallout impact based on winds on the morning of March 28, 1979, the study found no link between fallout and cancer risk. The study found that cancer rates near the Three Mile Island plant peaked in 1982-83, but their mathematical model did not account for the observed increase in cancer rates, since they argued that latency periods for cancer are much longer than three years. From 1975 to 1979 there were 1,722 reported cases of cancer, and between 1981 and 1985 there were 2,831, signifying a 64 percent increase after the meltdown. The study concludes that stress may have been a factor (though no specific biological mechanism was identified), and speculated that changes in cancer screening were more important.

=== Wing review ===
Subsequently, lawyers for 2000 residents asked epidemiologist Stephen Wing of the University of North Carolina at Chapel Hill, a specialist in nuclear radiation exposure, to re-examine the Columbia study. Wing was reluctant to get involved, later writing that "allegations of high radiation doses at TMI were considered by mainstream radiation scientists to be a product of radiation phobia or efforts to extort money from a blameless industry." Wing later noted that in order to obtain the relevant data, the Columbia study had to submit to what Wing called "a manipulation of research" in the form of a court order which prohibited "upper limit or worst case estimates of releases of radioactivity or population doses... [unless] such estimates would lead to a mathematical projection of less than 0.01 health effects." Wing found cancer rates raised within a 10-mile radius two years after the accident by 0.034% +/- 0.013%, 0.103% +/- 0.035%, and 0.139% +/- 0.073% for all cancer, lung cancer, and leukemia, respectively. An exchange of published responses between Wing and the Columbia team followed. Wing later noted a range of studies showing latency periods for cancer from radiation exposure between 1 and 5 years due to immune system suppression. Latencies between 1 and 9 years have been studied in a variety of contexts ranging from the Hiroshima survivors and the fallout from Chernobyl to therapeutic radiation; a 5-10 year latency is most common.

== Further studies ==
On the recommendation of the Columbia team, the TMI Public Health Fund followed up its work with a longitudinal study. The 2000-3 University of Pittsburgh study compared post-TMI death rates in different parts of the local area, again using the wind direction on the morning of 28 March to assign fallout impact, In contrast to the Columbia study, which estimated exposure in 69 areas, the Pittsburgh study drew on the TMI Population Registry, compiled by the Pennsylvania Department of Health. This was based on radiation exposure information on 93% of the population living within five miles of the nuclear plant - nearly 36,000 people, gathered in door-to-door surveys shortly after the accident. The study found slight increases in cancer and mortality rates but "no consistent evidence" of causation by TMI. Wing et al. criticized the Pittsburgh study for making the same assumption as Columbia: that the official statistics on low doses of radiation were correct - leading to a study "in which the null hypothesis cannot be rejected due to a priori assumptions." Hatch et al. noted that their assumption had been backed up by dosimeter data, though Wing et al. noted the incompleteness of this data, particularly for releases early on.

In 2005 R. William Field, an epidemiologist at the University of Iowa, who first described radioactive contamination of the wild food chain from the accident suggested that some of the increased cancer rates noted around TMI were related to the area's very high levels of natural radon, noting that according to a 1994 EPA study, the Pennsylvania counties around TMI have the highest regional screening radon concentrations in the 38 states surveyed. The factor had also been considered by the Pittsburgh study and by the Columbia team, which had noted that "rates of childhood leukemia in the Three Mile Island area are low compared with national and regional rates." A 2006 study on the standard mortality rate in children in 34 counties downwind of TMI found an increase in the rate (for cancers other than leukemia) from 0.83 (1979–83) to 1.17 (1984–88), meaning a rise from below the national average to above it.

A paper in 2008 studying thyroid cancer in the region found rates as expected in the county in which the reactor is located, and significantly higher than expected rates in two neighboring counties beginning in 1990 and 1995 respectively. The research notes that "These findings, however, do not provide a causal link to the TMI accident." According to Joseph Mangano (who is a member of The Radiation and Public Health Project, an organization with little credibility amongst epidemiologists,) three large gaps in the literature include: no study has focused on infant mortality data, or on data from outside the 10-mile zone, or on radioisotopes other than iodine, krypton, and xenon.

== See also ==
- Effects of the Chernobyl disaster
