= Nuclear fallout =

Residual radioactive material following a nuclear blast

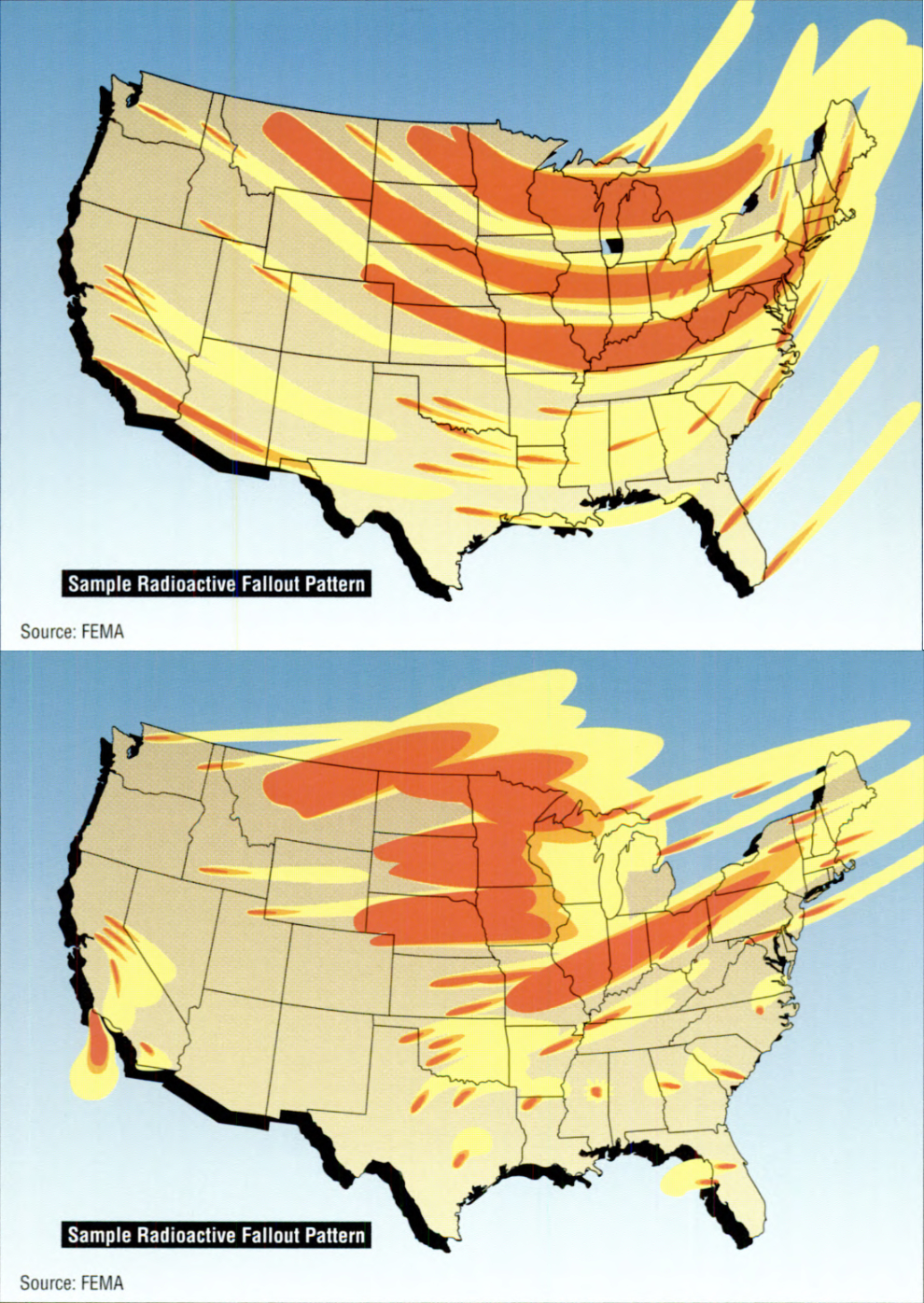
Two possible fallout patterns that could occur during a nuclear attack on the United States (mapped by the Federal Emergency Management Agency on the basis of 1988 data).

Atmospheric nuclear weapon tests almost doubled the concentration of radioactive ^{14}C in the Northern Hemisphere called the bomb pulse, before levels slowly declined following the Partial Test Ban Treaty.

Nuclear fallout is residual radioisotope material that is created by the reactions producing a nuclear explosion. It is initially present in the radioactive cloud created by the explosion, and "falls out" of the cloud as it is moved by the atmosphere in the minutes, hours, and days after the explosion. The amount of fallout and its distribution is dependent on several factors, including the overall yield of the weapon, the fission yield of the weapon, the height of burst of the weapon, and meteorological conditions.

Fission weapons and many thermonuclear weapons use a large mass of fissionable fuel (such as uranium or plutonium), so their fallout is primarily fission products, and some unfissioned fuel. Cleaner thermonuclear weapons primarily produce fallout via neutron activation. Salted bombs, not widely developed, are tailored to produce and disperse specific radioisotopes selected for their half-life and radiation type.

Fallout can have serious human health consequences on both short- and long-term time scales, and can cause radioactive contamination far away from the areas impacted by the more immediate effects of nuclear weapons. Atmospheric and underwater nuclear weapons testing, which widely disperses fallout, was ceased by the United States, Soviet Union, and United Kingdom following the 1963 Partial Nuclear Test Ban Treaty. Underground testing, which can sometimes cause fallout via venting, was largely ceased following the 1996 Comprehensive Nuclear-Test-Ban Treaty. The bomb pulse, the increase in global carbon-14 formed from neutron activation of nitrogen in air, is predicted to dominate long-term effects on humans from nuclear testing, causing ill effects and death in a small fraction of the population for up to 8,000 years.

Fallout can also refer to naturally occurring radioactive materials and material released by nuclear reactor accidents. The isotopic signature of bomb fallout is very different from the fallout from a reactor accident.

== Types of fallout ==
Fallout is usually divided into two major types, largely determined by the height of burst of the detonation. If detonated at a sufficient altitude that allows the fireball to avoid mixing significantly with ground debris, the radioactive byproducts in the fallout will generally stay aloft longer than weapons detonated at or near the surface. This additional time aloft allows the most acutely dangerous radioactive elements, with the shortest half-lives, to decay prior to their descending to the surface, reducing the overall radioactive intensity of the fallout that is deposited. This additional time also allows the radioactive cloud to diffuse over a larger area, resulting in less radioactive debris per area of land below. This more diffuse form of fallout is known as "global fallout," because its main effect is to raise background radiation exposure slightly over vast areas, and is contrasted with "local fallout," which produces a plume of concentrated radioactive byproducts downwind of the detonation within minutes or hours.

Meteorological realities can complicate these distinctions; "rainout," for example, can occur when atmospheric conditions cause precipitation from a nuclear cloud. A nuclear detonation underwater also produces a different local fallout than one on land. There have also been weapons detonated below the threshold for avoiding local fallout but that have not done so; the 50 megaton Tsar Bomba test in 1961, for example, had its fireball buoyantly boosted upwards by its reflected shockwave, preventing its mixture.

=== Global fallout ===
After the detonation of a weapon at or above the fallout-free altitude (an air burst), fission products, un-fissioned nuclear material, and weapon residues vaporized by the heat of the fireball condense into a suspension of particles 10 nm to 20 μm in diameter. This size of particulate matter, lifted to the stratosphere, may take months or years to settle, and may do so anywhere in the world. Its radioactive characteristics increase the statistical cancer risk, with one report estimating roughly 430,000 additional cancer deaths by the year 2000 and a total of 2.4 million additional cancer deaths over the next several thousand years from the measurably elevated atmospheric radioactivity after the widespread nuclear weapons testing of the 1950s, peaking in 1963 (the Bomb pulse). The additional radiation exposure (including future exposure) is estimated to amount to an average effective dose of 3.5 mSv, with global average natural background radiation levels being around 2.4 mSv per year.

Radioactive fallout has occurred around the world; for example, people have been exposed to iodine-131 from atmospheric nuclear testing. Fallout accumulates on vegetation, including fruits and vegetables. Starting from 1951 people may have gotten exposure, depending on whether they were outside, the weather, and whether they consumed contaminated milk, vegetables or fruit. Exposure can be on an intermediate time scale or long term. The intermediate time scale results from fallout that has been put into the troposphere and ejected by precipitation during the first month. Long-term fallout can sometimes occur from deposition of tiny particles carried in the stratosphere. By the time that stratospheric fallout has begun to reach the earth, the radioactivity is very much decreased. Also, after a year it is estimated that a sizable quantity of fission products move from the northern to the southern stratosphere. The intermediate time scale is between 1 and 30 days, with long term fallout occurring after that.

Examples of both intermediate and long term fallout occurred after the 1986 Chernobyl accident, which contaminated over 20,000 km^{2} (7,700 sq mi) of land in Ukraine and Belarus. The main fuel of the reactor was uranium, and surrounding this was graphite, both of which were vaporized by the hydrogen explosion that destroyed the reactor and breached its containment. An estimated 31 people died within a few weeks after this happened, including two plant workers killed at the scene. Although residents were evacuated within 36 hours, people started to complain of vomiting, migraines and other major signs of radiation sickness. The officials of Ukraine had to close off an area with an 18-mile (30 km) radius. Long term effects included at least 6,000 cases of thyroid cancer, mainly among children. Fallout spread throughout Europe, with Northern Scandinavia receiving a heavy dose, contaminating reindeer herds in Lapland, and salad greens becoming almost unavailable in France. Some sheep farms in North Wales and the North Of England were required to monitor radioactivity levels in their flocks until the control was lifted in 2012.

=== Local fallout ===
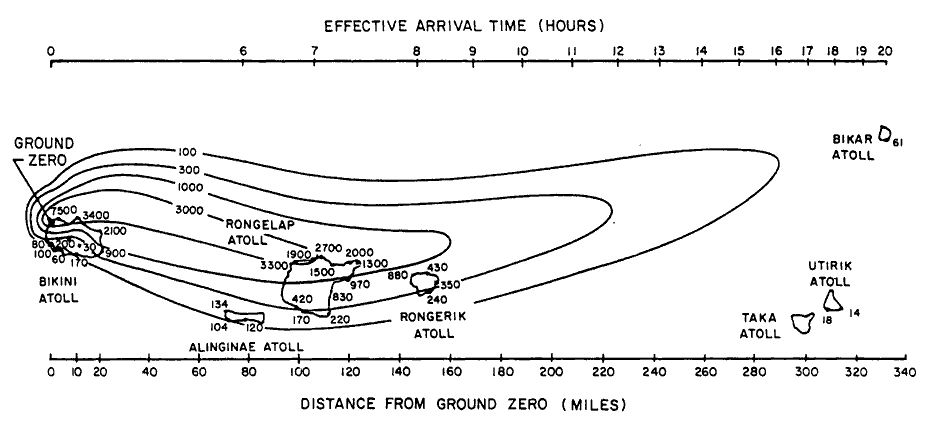
The 450 km (280 mi) fallout plume from 15 megaton surface burst Castle Bravo, 1954. "Estimated total (accumulated) dose contours in rads at 96 hours after the BRAVO test explosion"

During detonations of devices at ground level (surface burst), below the fallout-free altitude, or in shallow water, heat vaporizes large amounts of earth or water, which is drawn up into the radioactive cloud. This material becomes radioactive when it combines with fission products or other radio-contaminants, or when it is neutron-activated.

The table below summarizes the abilities of common isotopes to form fallout. Some radiation taints large amounts of land and drinking water causing formal mutations throughout animal and human life.

Table (according to T. Imanaka et al.) of the relative abilities of isotopes to form solids
Isotope	^{91}Sr	^{92}Sr	^{95}Zr	^{99}Mo	^{106}Ru	^{131}Sb	^{132}Te	^{134}Te	^{137}Cs	^{140}Ba	^{141}La	^{144}Ce
Refractive index	0.2	1.0	1.0	1.0	0.0	0.1	0.0	0.0	0.0	0.3	0.7	1.0

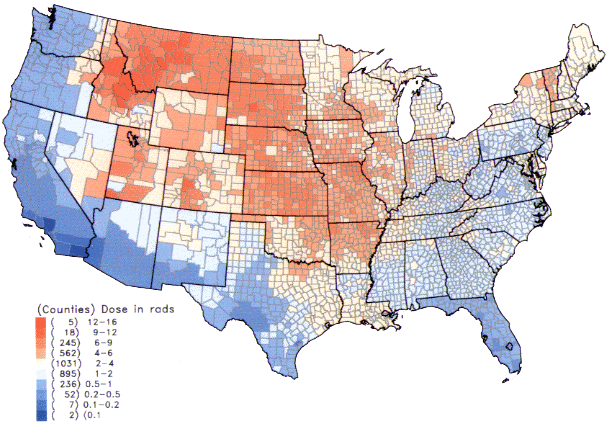
Per capita thyroid doses in the continental United States resulting from all exposure routes from all atmospheric nuclear tests conducted at the Nevada Test Site from 1951 to 1962 and from emissions from plutonium production at the Hanford Site in Washington state

A surface burst generates large amounts of particulate matter, composed of particles from less than 100 nm to several millimeters in diameter—in addition to very fine particles that contribute to worldwide fallout. The larger particles spill out of the stem and cascade down the outside of the fireball in a downdraft even as the cloud rises, so fallout begins to arrive near ground zero within an hour. More than half the total bomb debris lands on the ground within about 24 hours as local fallout. Chemical properties of the elements in the fallout control the rate at which they are deposited on the ground. Less volatile elements deposit first.

Severe local fallout contamination can extend far beyond the blast and thermal effects, particularly in the case of high yield surface detonations. The ground track of fallout from an explosion depends on the weather from the time of detonation onward. In stronger winds, fallout travels faster but takes the same time to descend, so although it covers a larger path, it is more spread out or diluted. Thus, the width of the fallout pattern for any given dose rate is reduced where the downwind distance is increased by higher winds. The total amount of activity deposited up to any given time is the same irrespective of the wind pattern, so overall casualty figures from fallout are generally independent of winds. But thunderstorms can bring down activity as rain allows fallout to drop more rapidly, particularly if the mushroom cloud is low enough to be below ("washout"), or mixed with ("rainout"), the thunderstorm.

Whenever individuals remain in a radiologically contaminated area, such contamination leads to an immediate external radiation exposure as well as a possible later internal hazard from inhalation and ingestion of radiocontaminants, such as the rather short-lived iodine-131, which is accumulated in the thyroid.

== Factors affecting fallout ==
=== Location ===
There are two main considerations for the location of an explosion: height and surface composition. A nuclear weapon detonated in the air, called an air burst, produces less fallout than a comparable explosion near the ground. A nuclear explosion in which the fireball touches the ground pulls soil and other materials into the cloud and neutron activates it before it falls back to the ground. An air burst produces a relatively small amount of the highly radioactive heavy metal components of the device itself.

In case of water surface bursts, the particles tend to be rather lighter and smaller, producing less local fallout but extending over a greater area. The particles contain mostly sea salts with some water; these can have a cloud seeding effect causing local rainout and areas of high local fallout. Fallout from a seawater burst is difficult to remove once it has soaked into porous surfaces because the fission products are present as metallic ions that chemically bond to many surfaces. Water and detergent washing effectively removes less than 50% of this chemically bonded activity from concrete or steel. Complete decontamination requires aggressive treatment like sandblasting, or acidic treatment. After the Crossroads underwater test, it was found that wet fallout must be immediately removed from ships by continuous water washdown (such as from the fire sprinkler system on the decks).

Parts of the sea bottom may become fallout. After the Castle Bravo test, white dust—contaminated calcium oxide particles originating from pulverized and calcined corals—fell for several hours, causing beta burns and radiation exposure to the inhabitants of the nearby atolls and the crew of the Daigo Fukuryū Maru fishing boat. The scientists called the fallout Bikini snow.

For subsurface bursts, there is an additional phenomenon present called "base surge". The base surge is a cloud that rolls outward from the bottom of the subsiding column, which is caused by an excessive density of dust or water droplets in the air. For underwater bursts, the visible surge is, in effect, a cloud of liquid (usually water) droplets with the property of flowing almost as if it were a homogeneous fluid. After the water evaporates, an invisible base surge of small radioactive particles may persist.

For subsurface land bursts, the surge is made up of small solid particles, but it still behaves like a fluid. A soil earth medium favors base surge formation in an underground burst. Although the base surge typically contains only about 10% of the total bomb debris in a subsurface burst, it can create larger radiation doses than fallout near the detonation, because it arrives sooner than fallout, before much radioactive decay has occurred.

=== Meteorological ===
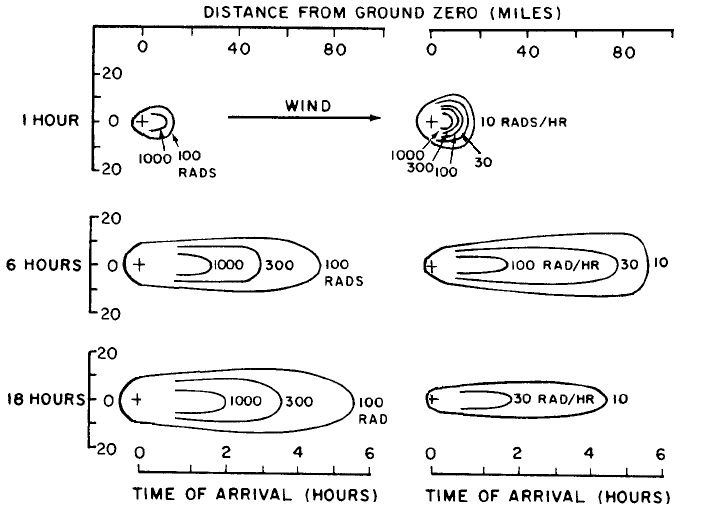
Comparison of fallout gamma dose and dose rate contours for a 1 Mt fission land surface burst, based on DELFIC calculations. Because of radioactive decay, the dose rate contours contract after fallout has arrived, but dose contours continue to grow.

Meteorological conditions greatly influence fallout, particularly local fallout. Atmospheric winds are able to bring fallout over large areas. For example, as a result of a Castle Bravo surface burst of a 15 Mt thermonuclear device at Bikini Atoll on 1 March 1954, a roughly cigar-shaped area of the Pacific extending over 500 km downwind and varying in width to a maximum of 100 km was severely contaminated. There are three very different versions of the fallout pattern from this test, because the fallout was measured only on a small number of widely spaced Pacific Atolls. The two alternative versions both ascribe the high radiation levels at north Rongelap to a downwind hot spot caused by the large amount of radioactivity carried on fallout particles of about 50–100 micrometres size.

After Bravo, it was discovered that fallout landing on the ocean disperses in the top water layer (above the thermocline at 100 m depth), and the land equivalent dose rate can be calculated by multiplying the ocean dose rate at two days after burst by a factor of about 530. In other 1954 tests, including Yankee and Nectar, hot spots were mapped out by ships with submersible probes, and similar hot spots occurred in 1956 tests such as Zuni and Tewa. The major U.S. "DELFIC" (Defence Land Fallout Interpretive Code) computer calculations use the natural size distributions of particles in soil instead of the afterwind sweep-up spectrum, and this results in more straightforward fallout patterns lacking the downwind hot spot.

Snow and rain, especially if they come from considerable heights, accelerate local fallout. Under special meteorological conditions, such as a local rain shower that originates above the radioactive cloud, limited areas of heavy contamination just downwind of a nuclear blast may be formed.

== Effects ==
A wide range of biological changes may follow the irradiation of animals. These vary from rapid death following high doses of penetrating whole-body radiation, to essentially normal lives for a variable period of time until the development of delayed radiation effects, in a portion of the exposed population, following low dose exposures.

The unit of actual exposure is the röntgen, defined in ionisations per unit volume of air. All ionisation based instruments (including geiger counters and ionisation chambers) measure exposure. Effects depend on the energy per unit mass, however, not the exposure measured in air. A deposit of 1 joule per kilogram has the unit of 1 gray (Gy). For 1 MeV energy gamma rays, an exposure of 1 röntgen in air produces a dose of about 0.01 gray (1 centigray, cGy) in water or surface tissue. Because of shielding by the tissue surrounding the bones, the bone marrow only receives about 0.67 cGy when the air exposure is 1 röntgen and the surface skin dose is 1 cGy. Some lower values reported for the amount of radiation that would kill 50% of personnel (the LD_{50}) refer to bone marrow dose, which is only 67% of the air dose.

=== Short term ===
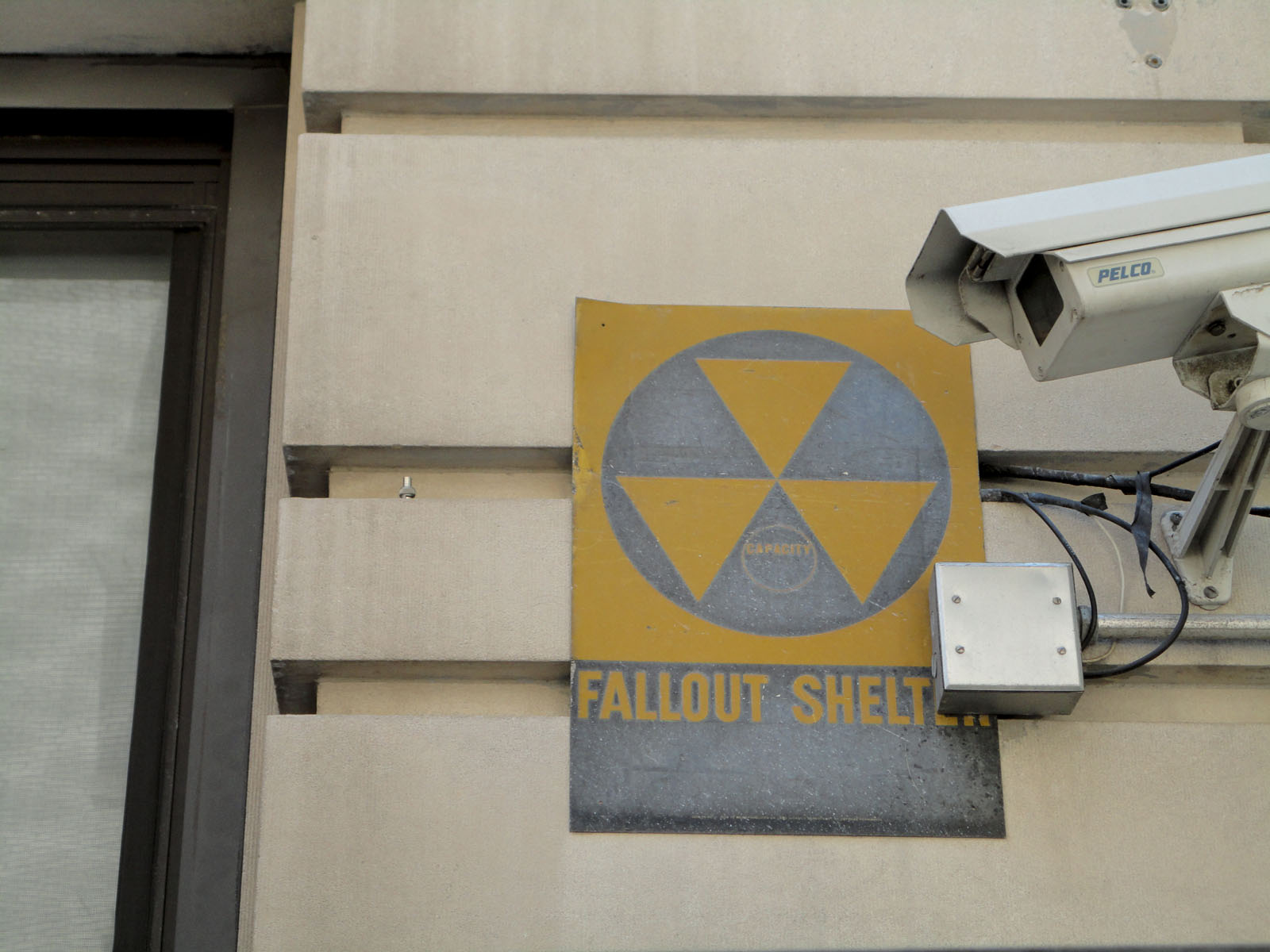
Fallout shelter sign on a building in New York City

The dose that would be lethal to 50% of a population is a common parameter used to compare the effects of various fallout types or circumstances. Usually, the term is defined for a specific time, and limited to studies of acute lethality. The common time periods used are 30 days or less for most small laboratory animals and to 60 days for large animals and humans. The LD_{50} figure assumes that the individuals did not receive other injuries or medical treatment.

In the 1950s, the LD_{50} for gamma rays was set at 3.5 Gy, while under more dire conditions of war (a bad diet, little medical care, poor nursing) the LD_{50} was 2.5 Gy (250 rad). There have been few documented cases of survival beyond 6 Gy. One person at Chernobyl survived a dose of more than 10 Gy, but many of the persons exposed there were not uniformly exposed over their entire body. If a person is exposed in a non-homogeneous manner then a given dose (averaged over the entire body) is less likely to be lethal. For instance, if a person gets a hand/low arm dose of 100 Gy, which gives them an overall dose of 4 Gy, they are more likely to survive than a person who gets a 4 Gy dose over their entire body. A hand dose of 10 Gy or more would likely result in loss of the hand. A British industrial radiographer who was estimated to have received a hand dose of 100 Gy over the course of his lifetime lost his hand because of radiation dermatitis. Most people become ill after an exposure to 1 Gy or more. Fetuses are often more vulnerable to radiation and may miscarry, especially in the first trimester.

Because of the large amount of short-lived fission products, the activity and radiation levels of nuclear fallout decrease very quickly after being released; it is reduced by 50% in the first hour after a detonation, then by 80% during the first day. As a result, early gross decontamination, such as removing contaminated articles of outer clothing, is more effective than delayed but more thorough cleaning. Most areas become fairly safe for travel and decontamination after three to five weeks.

One hour after a surface burst, the radiation from fallout in the crater region is 30 grays per hour (Gy/h). Civilian dose rates in peacetime range from 30 to 100 μGy per year.

For yields of up to 10 kt, prompt radiation is the dominant producer of casualties on the battlefield. Humans receiving an acute incapacitating dose (30 Gy) have their performance degraded almost immediately and become ineffective within several hours. They do not die until five to six days after exposure, however, assuming they do not receive any other injuries. Individuals receiving less than a total of 1.5 Gy are not incapacitated. People receiving doses greater than 1.5 Gy become disabled, and some eventually die.

A dose of 5.3 Gy to 8.3 Gy is considered lethal but not immediately incapacitating. Personnel exposed to this amount of radiation have their cognitive performance degraded in two to three hours, depending on how physically demanding the tasks they must perform are, and remain in this disabled state at least two days. At that point, however, they experience a recovery period and can perform non-demanding tasks for about six days, after which they relapse for about four weeks. At this time they begin exhibiting symptoms of radiation poisoning of sufficient severity to render them totally ineffective. Death follows at approximately six weeks after exposure, although outcomes may vary.

=== Long term ===
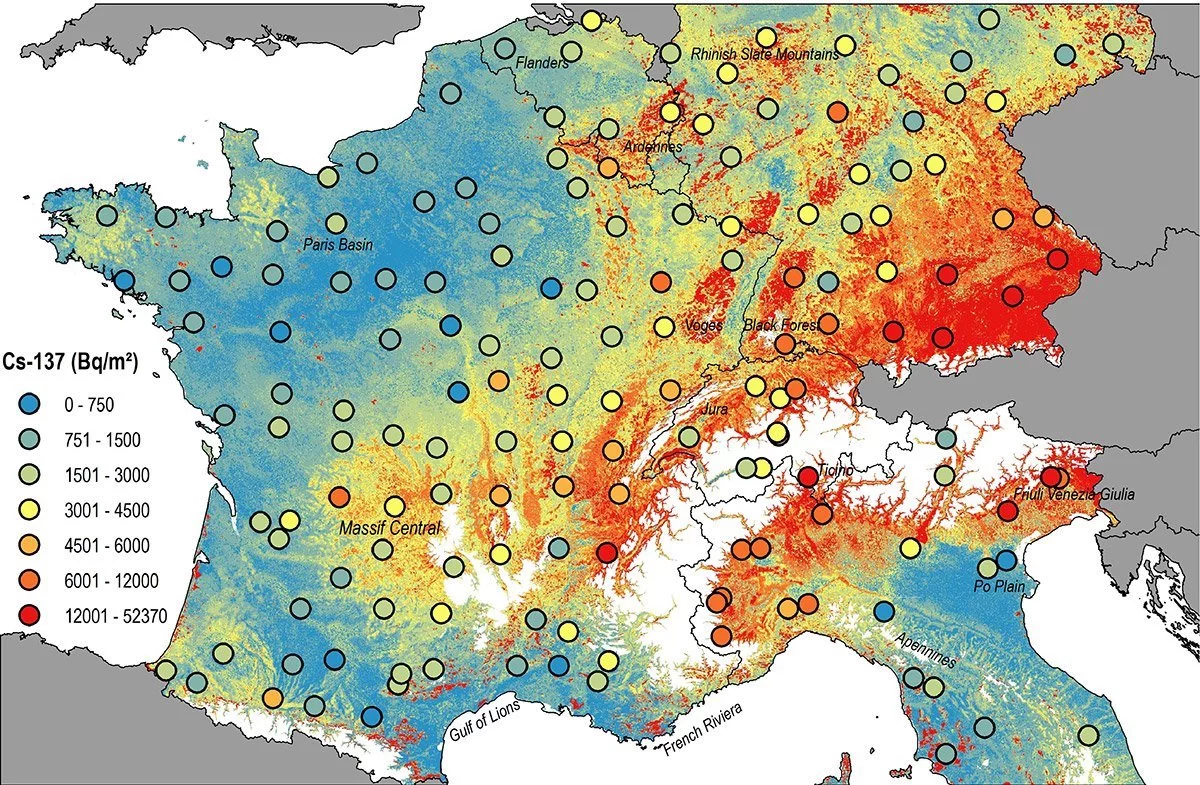
Caesium-137 in Western European soil, from the Chernobyl disaster and its deposition through the weather

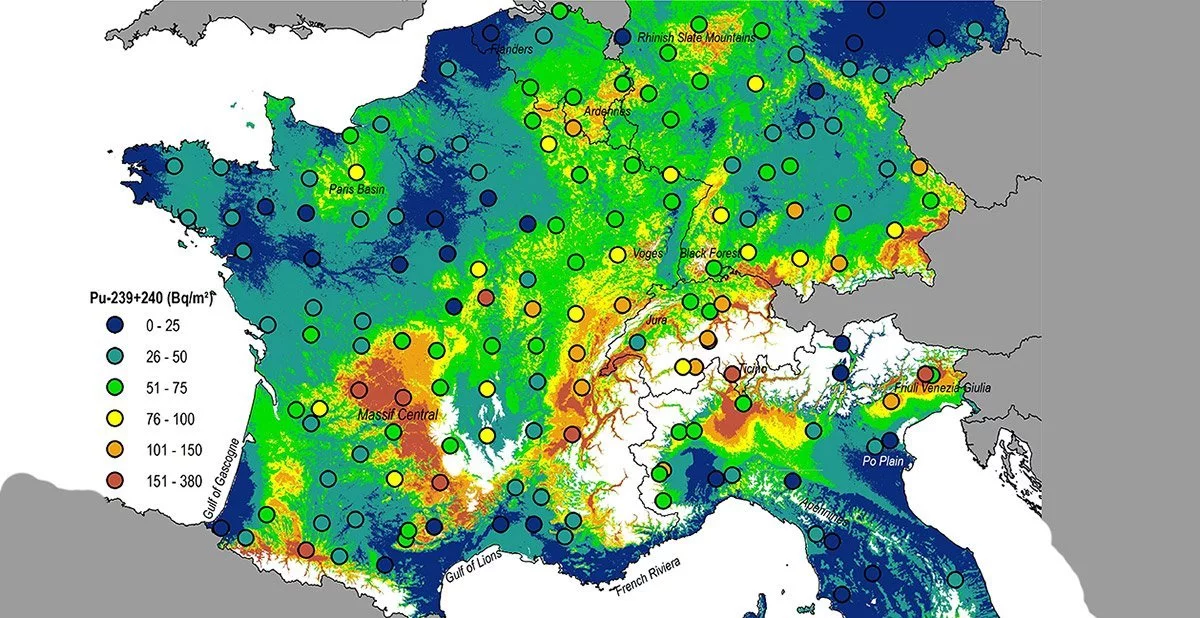
Plutonium-239 and -240 in soil, from nuclear weapons tests and its deposition through the weather

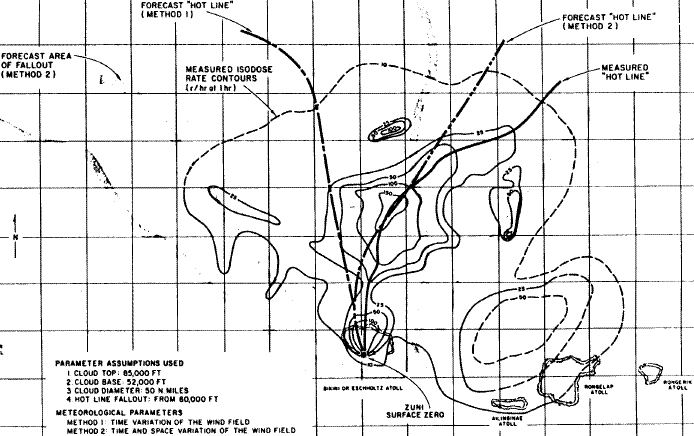
Comparison of predicted fallout "hotline" with test results in the 3.53 Mt 15% fission Zuni test at Bikini in 1956. The predictions were made under simulated tactical nuclear war conditions aboard ship by Edward A. Schuert.

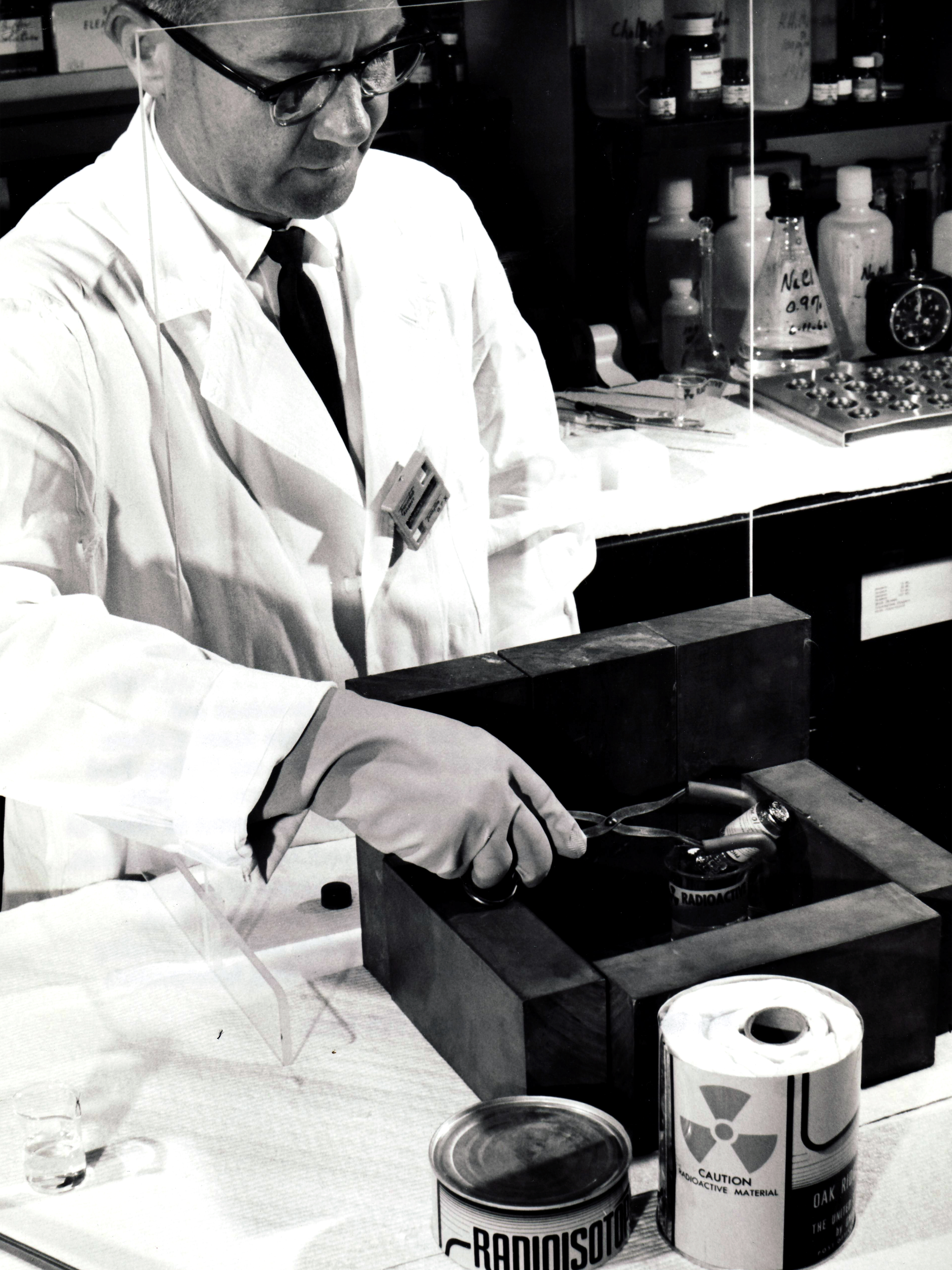
Following the detonation of the first atomic bomb, pre-war steel and post-war steel that is manufactured without atmospheric air, became a valuable commodity for scientists wishing to make extremely precise instruments that detect radioactive emissions, because these two types of steel are the only steels that do not contain trace amounts of fallout.

Late or delayed effects of radiation occur following a wide range of doses and dose rates. Delayed effects may appear months to years after irradiation and include a wide variety of effects involving almost all tissues or organs. Some of the possible delayed consequences of radiation injury, with the rates above the background prevalence, depending on the absorbed dose, include carcinogenesis, cataract formation, chronic radiodermatitis, decreased fertility, and genetic mutations.

Presently, the only teratological effect observed in humans following nuclear attacks on highly populated areas is microcephaly, which is the only proven malformation, or congenital abnormality, found in the in utero developing human fetuses present during the Hiroshima and Nagasaki bombings. Of all the pregnant women who were close enough to be exposed to the prompt burst of intense neutron and gamma doses in the two cities, the total number of children born with microcephaly was below 50. No statistically demonstrable increase of congenital malformations was found among the later conceived children born to survivors of the nuclear detonations at Hiroshima and Nagasaki. The surviving women of Hiroshima and Nagasaki who could conceive and were exposed to substantial amounts of radiation went on and had children with no higher incidence of abnormalities than the Japanese average.

The Baby Tooth Survey founded by the husband and wife team of physicians Eric Reiss and Louise Reiss, was a research effort focused on detecting the presence of strontium-90, a cancer-causing radioactive isotope created by the more than 400 atomic tests conducted above ground that is absorbed from water and dairy products into the bones and teeth given its chemical similarity to calcium. The team sent collection forms to schools in the St. Louis, Missouri area, hoping to gather 50,000 teeth each year. Ultimately, the project collected over 300,000 teeth from children of various ages before the project was ended in 1970.

Preliminary results of the Baby Tooth Survey were published in the 24 November 1961, edition of the journal Science, and showed that levels of strontium-90 had risen steadily in children born in the 1950s, with those born later showing the most pronounced increases. The results of a more comprehensive study of the elements found in the teeth collected showed that children born after 1963 had levels of strontium-90 in their baby teeth that was 50 times higher than that found in children born before large-scale atomic testing began. The findings helped convince U.S. President John F. Kennedy to sign the Partial Nuclear Test Ban Treaty with the United Kingdom and Soviet Union, which ended the above-ground nuclear weapons testing that created the greatest amounts of atmospheric nuclear fallout.

Some considered the baby tooth survey a "campaign [that] effectively employed a variety of media advocacy strategies" to alarm the public and "galvanized" support against atmospheric nuclear testing, and putting an end to such testing was commonly viewed as a positive outcome for a myriad of reasons. The survey could not show at the time, nor in the decades that have elapsed, that the levels of global strontium-90 or fallout in general, were life-threatening, primarily because "50 times the strontium-90 from before nuclear testing" is a minuscule number, and multiplication of minuscule numbers results in only a slightly larger minuscule number. Moreover, the Radiation and Public Health Project that currently retains the teeth has had their stance and publications criticized: a 2003 article in The New York Times states that many scientists consider the group's work controversial, with little credibility with the scientific establishment, while some scientists consider it "good, careful work". In an April 2014 article in Popular Science, Sarah Fecht argues that the group's work, specifically the widely discussed case of cherry-picking data to suggest that fallout from the 2011 Fukushima accident caused infant deaths in America, is "junk science", as despite their papers being peer-reviewed, independent attempts to corroborate their results return findings that are not in agreement with what the organization suggests. The organization had earlier suggested the same thing occurred after the 1979 Three Mile Island accident, though the Atomic Energy Commission argued this was unfounded. The tooth survey, and the organization's new target of pushing for test bans with US nuclear electric power stations, is detailed and critically labelled as the "Tooth Fairy issue" by the Nuclear Regulatory Commission.

=== Effects on the environment ===
In the event of a large-scale nuclear exchange, the effects would be drastic on the environment as well as directly to the human population. Within direct blast zones everything would be vaporized and destroyed. Cities damaged but not completely destroyed would lose their water system due to the loss of power and supply lines rupturing. Within the local nuclear fallout pattern suburban areas' water supplies would become extremely contaminated. At this point stored water would be the only safe water to use. All surface water within the fallout would be contaminated by falling fission products.

Within the first few months of the nuclear exchange the nuclear fallout will continue to develop and detriment the environment. Dust, smoke, and radioactive particles will fall hundreds of kilometers downwind of the explosion point and pollute surface water supplies. Iodine-131 would be the dominant fission product within the first few weeks, and in the months following the dominant fission product would be strontium-90. These fission products would remain in the fallout dust, resulting in rivers, lakes, sediments, and soils being contaminated with the fallout.

Rural areas' water supplies would be slightly less polluted by fission particles in intermediate and long-term fallout than cities and suburban areas. Without additional contamination, the lakes, reservoirs, rivers, and runoff would be gradually less contaminated as water continued to flow through its system.

Groundwater supplies such as aquifers would, however, remain unpolluted initially in the event of a nuclear fallout. Over time the groundwater could become contaminated with fallout particles, and would remain contaminated for over 10 years after a nuclear engagement. It would take hundreds or thousands of years for an aquifer to become completely pure. Groundwater would still be safer than surface water supplies and would need to be consumed in smaller doses. Long term, cesium-137 and strontium-90 would be the major radionuclides affecting the fresh water supplies.

The dangers of nuclear fallout do not stop at increased risks of cancer and radiation sickness, but also include the presence of radionuclides in human organs from food. A fallout event would leave fission particles in the soil for animals to consume, followed by humans. Radioactively contaminated milk, meat, fish, vegetables, grains and other food would all be dangerous because of fallout.

From 1945 to 1967 the U.S. conducted hundreds of nuclear weapon tests. Atmospheric testing took place over the US mainland during this time and as a consequence scientists have been able to study the effect of nuclear fallout on the environment. Detonations conducted near the surface of the earth irradiated thousands of tons of soil. Of the material drawn into the atmosphere, portions of radioactive material will be carried by low altitude winds and deposited in surrounding areas as radioactive dust. The material intercepted by high altitude winds will continue to travel. When a radiation cloud at high altitude is exposed to rainfall, the radioactive fallout will contaminate the downwind area below.

"About Fallout" (1955) - Official U.S. Civil Defense information film reel.

Agricultural fields and plants will absorb the contaminated material and animals will consume the radioactive material. As a result, the nuclear fallout may cause livestock to become ill or die, and if consumed the radioactive material will be passed on to humans.

The damage to other living organism as a result to nuclear fallout depends on the species. Mammals particularly are extremely sensitive to nuclear radiation, followed by birds, plants, fish, reptiles, crustaceans, insects, moss, lichen, algae, bacteria, mollusks, and viruses.

Climatologist Alan Robock and atmospheric and oceanic sciences professor Brian Toon created a model of a hypothetical small-scale nuclear war that would have approximately 100 weapons used. In this scenario, the fires would create enough soot into the atmosphere to block sunlight, lowering global temperatures by more than one degree Celsius. The result would have the potential of creating widespread food insecurity (nuclear famine). Precipitation across the globe would be disrupted as a result. If enough soot was introduced in the upper atmosphere the planet's ozone layer could potentially be depleted, affecting plant growth and human health.

Radiation from the fallout would linger in soil, plants, and food chains for years. Marine food chains are more vulnerable to the nuclear fallout and the effects of soot in the atmosphere.

Fallout radionuclides' detriment in the human food chain is apparent in the lichen-caribou-eskimo studies in Alaska. The primary effect on humans observed was thyroid dysfunction. The result of a nuclear fallout is incredibly detrimental to human survival and the biosphere. Fallout alters the quality of our atmosphere, soil, and water and causes species to go extinct.

== Fallout protection ==
Public safety film created by the United States Office of Civil and Defense Mobilization from 1959

During the Cold War, the governments of the U.S., the USSR, Great Britain, and China attempted to educate their citizens about surviving a nuclear attack by providing procedures on minimizing short-term exposure to fallout. This effort commonly became known as Civil Defense.

Fallout protection is almost exclusively concerned with protection from radiation. Radiation from a fallout is encountered in the forms of alpha, beta, and gamma radiation, and as ordinary clothing affords protection from alpha and beta radiation, most fallout protection measures deal with reducing exposure to gamma radiation. For the purposes of radiation shielding, many materials have a characteristic halving thickness: the thickness of a layer of a material sufficient to reduce gamma radiation exposure by 50%. Halving thicknesses of common materials include: 1 cm (0.4 inch) of lead, 6 cm (2.4 inches) of concrete, 9 cm (3.6 inches) of packed earth or 150 m (500 ft) of air. When multiple thicknesses are built, the shielding multiplies. A practical fallout shield is ten halving-thicknesses of a given material, such as 90 cm (36 inches) of packed earth, which reduces gamma ray exposure by approximately 1024 times (2^{10}). A shelter built with these materials for the purposes of fallout protection is known as a fallout shelter.

=== Personal protective equipment ===
As the nuclear energy sector continues to grow, the international rhetoric surrounding nuclear warfare intensifies, and the ever-present threat of radioactive materials falling into the hands of dangerous people persists, many scientists are working hard to find the best way to protect human organs from the harmful effects of high energy radiation. Acute radiation syndrome (ARS) is the most immediate risk to humans when exposed to ionizing radiation in dosages greater than around 0.1 Gy/hr. Radiation in the low energy spectrum (alpha and beta radiation) with minimal penetrating power is unlikely to cause significant damage to internal organs (although if contamination is ingested, inhaled or on the skin, and thus in close proximity to tissues and organs, the effect of these 'massive' particles may be catastrophic). The high penetrating power of gamma and neutron radiation, however, easily penetrates the skin and many thin shielding mechanisms to cause cellular degeneration in the stem cells found in bone marrow. While full body shielding in a secure fallout shelter as described above is the most optimal form of radiation protection, it requires being locked in a very thick bunker for a significant amount of time. In the event of a nuclear catastrophe of any kind, it is imperative to have mobile protection equipment for medical and security personnel to perform necessary containment, evacuation, and any number of other important public safety objectives. The mass of the shielding material required to properly protect the entire body from high energy radiation would make functional movement essentially impossible. This has led scientists to begin researching the idea of partial body protection: a strategy inspired by hematopoietic stem cell transplantation (HSCT). The idea is to use enough shielding material to sufficiently protect the high concentration of bone marrow in the pelvic region, which contains enough regenerative stem cells to repopulate the body with unaffected bone marrow. More information on bone marrow shielding can be found in the Health Physics Radiation Safety Journal article Selective Shielding of Bone Marrow: An Approach to Protecting Humans from External Gamma Radiation, or in the Organisation for Economic Co-operation and Development (OECD) and the Nuclear Energy Agency (NEA)'s 2015 report: Occupational Radiation Protection in Severe Accident Management.

=== The seven-ten rule ===
The danger of radiation from fallout also decreases rapidly with time due in large part to the exponential decay of the individual radionuclides. A book by Cresson H. Kearny presents data showing that for the first few days after the explosion, the radiation dose rate is reduced by a factor of ten for every seven-fold increase in the number of hours since the explosion. He presents data showing that "it takes about seven times as long for the dose rate to decay from 1000 roentgens per hour (1000 R/hr) to 10 R/hr (48 hours) as to decay from 1000 R/hr to 100 R/hr (7 hours)." This is a rule of thumb based on observed data, not a precise relation.

=== United States government guides for fallout protection ===
The United States government, often the Office of Civil Defense in the Department of Defense, provided guides to fallout protection in the 1960s, frequently in the form of booklets. These booklets provided information on how to best survive nuclear fallout. They also included instructions for various fallout shelters, whether for a family, a hospital, or a school shelter were provided. There were also instructions for how to create an improvised fallout shelter, and what to do to best increase a person's chances for survival if they were unprepared.

The central idea in these guides is that materials like concrete, soil, and sand are necessary to shield a person from fallout particles and radiation. A significant amount of materials of this type are necessary to protect a person from fallout radiation, so safety clothing cannot protect a person from fallout radiation. Protective clothing can keep fallout particles off a person's body, but the radiation from these particles will still permeate through the clothing. For safety clothing to be able to block the fallout radiation, it would have to be so thick and heavy that a person could not function.

These guides indicated that fallout shelters should contain enough resources to keep its occupants alive for up to two weeks. Community shelters were preferred over single-family shelters. The more people in a shelter, the greater quantity and variety of resources that shelter would be equipped with. These communities' shelters would also help facilitate efforts to recuperate the community in the future. Single family shelters should be built below ground if possible. Many different types of fallout shelters could be made for a relatively small amount of money. A common format for fallout shelters was to build the shelter underground, with solid concrete blocks to act as the roof. If a shelter could only be partially underground, it was recommended to mound over that shelter with as much soil as possible. If a house had a basement, it is best for a fallout shelter to be constructed in a corner of the basement. The center of a basement is where the most radiation will be because the easiest way for radiation to enter a basement is from the floor above. Two of the walls of the shelter in a basement corner will be the basement walls that are surrounded by soil outside. Cinder blocks filled with sand or soil were highly recommended for the other two walls. Concrete blocks, or some other dense material, should be used as a roof for a basement fallout shelter because the floor of a house is not an adequate roof for a fallout shelter. These shelters should contain water, food, tools, and a method for dealing with human waste.

If a person did not have a shelter previously built, these guides recommended trying to get underground. If a person had a basement but no shelter, they should put food, water, and a waste container in the corner of the basement. Then items such as furniture should be piled up to create walls around the person in the corner. If the underground cannot be reached, a tall apartment building at least ten miles from the blast was recommended as a good fallout shelter. People in these buildings should get as close to the center of the building as possible and avoid the top and ground floors.

Schools were the preferred fallout shelters according to the Office of Civil Defense. Schools, not including universities, contained around one-quarter of the population of the United States when they were in session at that time. The distribution of schools across the nation reflected the population density, and they were often the most suitable building in a community to act as a fallout shelter. Schools also already had organization with leaders in place. The Office of Civil Defense recommended altering current schools and the construction of future schools to include thicker walls and roofs, better-protected electrical systems, a purifying ventilation system, and a protected water pump. The Office of Civil Defense determined that around 10 square feet of net area per person were necessary in schools that were to function as a fallout shelter. A normal classroom could provide 180 people with area to sleep. If an attack were to happen, all the unnecessary furniture was to be moved out of the classrooms to make more room for people. It was recommended to keep one or two tables in the room if possible to use as a food-serving station.

The Office of Civil Defense conducted four case studies to find the cost of turning four standing schools into fallout shelters and what their capacity would be. The cost of the schools per occupant in the 1960s were $66.00, $127.00, $50.00, and $180.00. The capacity of people these schools could house as shelters were 735, 511, 484, and 460 respectively.

The US Department of Homeland Security and the Federal Emergency Management Agency in coordination with other agencies concerned with public protection in the aftermath of a nuclear detonation have developed more recent guidance documents that build on the older Civil Defense frameworks. Planning Guidance for Response to a Nuclear Detonation was published in 2022 and provided in-depth analysis and response planning for local government jurisdictions.

== Nuclear reactor accident ==
Fallout can also refer to radioactive material generated by nuclear reactor accidents (such as Chernobyl or Fukushima), although a nuclear reactor does not explode like a nuclear weapon. The isotopic signature of bomb fallout is very different from the fallout from a reactor accident. Because the core of a nuclear reactor builds up fission fragments over months or years, it contains more overall radioactivity than is produced in a nuclear explosion, and contains a higher proportion of long-lived fission products.

The field of nuclear safety deals with the prevention of nuclear accidents and the mitigation of their negative effects, including nuclear fallout. In the United States, safety regulations were first developed by the Atomic Energy Commission in the 1950s and 60s.

=== Chernobyl ===
The 1986 nuclear reactor explosion at Chernobyl was categorized as a Level 7 accident, which is the highest possible ranking on the INES scale, due to widespread environmental and health effects and "external release of a significant fraction of reactor core inventory". The nuclear accident still stands as the only accident in commercial nuclear power that led to radiation-related deaths. The steam explosion and fires released approximately 5200 PBq, or at least 5 percent of the reactor core, into the atmosphere. The explosion itself resulted in the deaths of two plant workers, while 28 people died over the weeks that followed of severe radiation poisoning. Furthermore, young children and adolescents in the areas most contaminated by the radiation exposure showed an increase in the risk for thyroid cancer, although the United Nations Scientific Committee on the Effects of Atomic Radiation stated that "there is no evidence of a major public health impact" apart from that. The nuclear accident also took a heavy toll on the environment, including contamination in urban environments caused by the deposition of radionuclides and the contamination of "different crop types, in particular, green leafy vegetables ... depending on the deposition levels, and time of the growing season".

=== Three Mile Island ===
The nuclear meltdown at Three Mile Island in 1979 was categorized as a Level 5 accident on the INES scale because of the "severe damage to the reactor core" and the radiation leak caused by the incident. Three Mile Island was the most serious accident in the history of American commercial nuclear power plants, yet the effects were different from those of the Chernobyl accident. A study done by the Nuclear Regulatory Commission following the incident reveals that the nearly 2 million people surrounding the Three Mile Island plant "are estimated to have received an average radiation dose of only 1 millirem above the usual background dose". Furthermore, unlike those affected by radiation in the Chernobyl accident, the development of thyroid cancer in the people around Three Mile Island was "less aggressive and less advanced".

=== Fukushima ===
Calculated caesium-137 concentration in the air, 25 March 2011

Like the Three Mile Island incident, the incident at Fukushima was initially categorized as a Level 5 accident on the INES scale after a tsunami disabled the power supply and cooling of three reactors, which then suffered significant melting in the days that followed. After combining the events at the three reactors, rather than assessing them individually, the accident was upgraded to an INES Level 7. The radiation exposure from the incident caused a recommended evacuation for inhabitants up to 30 km away from the plant. It was also hard to track such exposure because 23 out of the 24 radioactive monitoring stations were also disabled by the tsunami. Removing contaminated water, both in the plant itself and run-off water that spread into the sea and nearby areas, became a huge challenge for the Japanese government and plant workers. During the containment period following the accident, thousands of cubic meters of slightly contaminated water were released in the sea to free up storage for more contaminated water in the reactor and turbine buildings. The fallout from the Fukushima accident had a minimal impact on the surrounding population. According to the Institut de Radioprotection et de Sûreté Nucléaire, over 62 percent of assessed residents within the Fukushima prefecture received external doses of less than 1 mSv in the four months following the accident. In addition, comparing screening campaigns for children inside the Fukushima prefecture and in the rest of the country revealed no significant difference in the risk of thyroid cancer.

== See also ==
- Debris fallout
- Dirty bomb
- Fallout: An American Nuclear Tragedy
- Fallout Protection—U.S. government booklet
- Effects of nuclear explosions
- Fallout from the Trinity nuclear test
- Fallout (RTÉ drama)—Irish drama exploring scenarios following a nuclear accident at Sellafield.
- Fallout (series)
- Fallout shelter
- Fission product
- Hot particle
- Human radiation experiments
- List of nuclear accidents
- Lists of nuclear disasters and radioactive incidents
- Neutron bomb
- Mutation breeding#Radiation breeding
- Nuclear fallout effects on an ecosystem
- Nuclear terrorism
- Nuclear War Survival Skills by Cresson Kearny
- Nuclear weapon design
- Potassium iodide
- Project GABRIEL
- Protect and Survive, a series of booklets and a public information film series produced for the British government in the 1970s and 1980s.
- Radioactive contamination
- Radiation poisoning
- Radiation biology
- Radioactive waste
- Radiological weapon
- Joseph Rotblat
- Salted bomb
- Survival Under Atomic Attack, an official U.S. government booklet regarding the effects of a nuclear attack.
