= Radiological Response and Emergency Management System =

British radiation monitoring and warning system

The Radiological Response and Emergency Management System (RREMS) is a system managed by the Department for Energy Security and Net Zero and used by the Government of the United Kingdom which records and analyses the level of radioactivity across the United Kingdom. A reading is taken from each of the over 200 stations every hour and an alert triggered if radiation levels for specific isotopes rise significantly above normal background radiation levels at one or more stations. RREMS replaced the older Radioactive Incident Monitoring Network (RIMNET) system in September 2022.

Stations are distributed across the UK, but are more concentrated at coastal areas. Many monitoring sites are also located at or nearby airports, including Gatwick, Heathrow, Stansted and Lydd.

As well as being of use in an emergency, the stations also serve to record historical data on radiation levels.

== History ==
The precursor to RREMS was the Radioactive Incident Monitoring Network (RIMNET), established in 1988 as a response to the Chernobyl disaster in 1986. RIMNET was managed by the Met Office and Department for Environment, Food and Rural Affairs.

RIMNET data was collected at a central computer based in a DEFRA building in central London alongside a backup computer at a secret location in the UK.

== Technology ==
The modern RREMS system is operated by CGI following a successful contract bid in 2018. The system is run within cloud computing servers.

The network of monitoring stations includes 93 fixed and an unknown number of mobile stations located strategically across the country. These are operated by Ultra Electronics.

== See also ==
- Centre for Radiation, Chemical and Environmental Hazards (CRCE) in Oxfordshire
