= Radiation and Public Health Project =

Radiation and Public Health Project (RPHP) is a nonprofit educational and scientific organization founded in 1985 by Jay M. Gould, a statistician and epidemiologist, Benjamin A. Goldman, and Ernest Sternglass. The "shoestring organization" with "offices mainly on [Joseph J. Mangano's] kitchen table" was established to examine the relationships between low-level nuclear radiation and public health and question the safety of nuclear power.

According to a 2003 article in The New York Times, the group's work has been controversial, and had little credibility with the scientific establishment. Similarly the work of the RPHP has been criticized by the US Nuclear Regulatory Commission: "Numerous peer-reviewed scientific studies do not support the RPHP's claims. NRC finds there is little or no credibility in the RHP's studies". In an April 2014 article in Popular Science, Sarah Epstein referred to the group's work as "junk science" and disputed the group's peer-reviewed publications as being insufficiently evaluated.

== Baby teeth ==
A set of 85,000 teeth that had been collected by Dr. Louise Reiss and her colleagues as part of the Baby Tooth Survey were uncovered in 2001 and given to the Radiation and Public Health Project. By tracking the individuals who had participated in the tooth-collection project, the RPHP published results in a 2010 issue of the International Journal of Health Service that claimed that those children who later died of cancer before the age of 50 had levels of strontium-90 (^{90}Sr) in their stored baby teeth that was twice the level of those who were still alive at 50. This paper was criticized by Stephen Musolino, a health physicist and specialist in radiation protection at Brookhaven National Laboratory, as it "confuses correlation with causation" and in their opinion the authors of the paper are "ice-cream epidemiologists".

The National Cancer Institute, National Institutes of Health, Nuclear Regulatory Commission and nuclear industry groups responded with statements that the study was flawed. The groups stated that the study suffered from small sample sizes; no control populations; no other cancer risk factors considered; no environmental sampling and analysis; cherry picking of data to fit the conclusion; and an incorrect half-life used for strontium-90. The Nuclear Regulatory Commission has not changed its opinion that there is no excess cancer risk from living near nuclear facilities.

== Leukemia study ==
This study was published in a 2008 issue of the European Journal of Cancer Care. It disputes a large scale analysis conducted by the National Cancer Institute in the late 1980s. Mangano and Sherman's study found that leukemia death rates in U.S. children near nuclear reactors rose sharply (vs. the national trend) in the past two decades. The greatest mortality increases occurred near the oldest nuclear plants, while declines were observed near plants that closed permanently in the 1980s and 1990s.

Other studies in the US and UK have shown decreases in cancer incidence in the vicinity of nuclear power plants after they have started operating.

== Fukushima ==
After the Fukushima disaster, Mangano and Sherman published several articles claiming detrimental health effects in America caused by fallout from Japan:

In a June 2011 article in CounterPunch, they claimed a 35% increase in infant mortality on the West coast of the United States in the 10 weeks after the disaster, vs the 4 weeks prior. Michael Moyer of Scientific American stated that their claims are "critically flawed—if not deliberate mistruths", pointing out that this increase only appears when choosing these specific time periods, and there is no trend in the overall numbers for the year.

In January 2012, they claimed that fallout from Fukushima resulted in 13,983 excess deaths in the United States in the 14 weeks following the disaster. This study was criticized for including different numbers of cities in the "before" and "after" categories, for cities with more fallout being reported as having fewer deaths, and for there being no plausible mechanism by which very small amounts of radiation could result in immediate death.

In a March 2013 article, published in the Open Journal of Pedriatrics, they claimed a 16% increase in cases of congenital hypothyroidism (CH) in 5 US states in the 10 months following the disaster. This study was criticized for again creating a "trend" out of random statistical variation and using incorrect definitions of CH based only on TSH scores. The publisher of the journal the paper appeared in, Scientific Research Publishing, has been accused of being a predatory open access publisher.

Jannet Sherman died in 2019 of combination of dementia and Addison's disease.

== See also ==
- Three Mile Island accident
- Index of radiation articles
- Davis–Besse Nuclear Power Station
- John Gofman
- List of civilian nuclear accidents
- Nuclear accidents in the United States
