= Louise Reiss =

American physician (1920 – 2011)

Louise Marie Zibold Reiss
- Louise Reiss in 2003
- Born: February 23, 1920; Queens, New York City
- Died: January 1, 2011 (aged 90); Pinecrest, Florida
- Education: Woman's Medical College of Pennsylvania (currently Drexel University College of Medicine)
- Known for: Baby Tooth Survey

Louise Marie Zibold Reiss (February 23, 1920 – January 1, 2011) was an American physician who coordinated what became known as the Baby Tooth Survey, in which deciduous teeth from children living in the St. Louis, Missouri, area who were born in the 1950s and 1960s were collected and analyzed over a period of 12 years. The results of the survey showed that children born in 1963 had levels of strontium-90 in their teeth that were 50 times higher than those found in children born in 1950, before the advent of widespread nuclear weapons testing. The findings helped convince U.S. President John F. Kennedy to sign the Partial Nuclear Test Ban Treaty with the United Kingdom and Soviet Union, which ended the above-ground testing of nuclear weapons that placed the greatest amounts of nuclear fallout into the atmosphere.

== Early life and education ==
Born in the Queens borough of New York City on February 23, 1920, Reiss contracted polio as a child. She originally planned to study art in college, but decided to switch to science after the outbreak of World War II. Raised in White Plains, New York, she graduated from White Plains High School and attended Skidmore College and the University of Pennsylvania.

She earned her medical degree at the Woman's Medical College of Pennsylvania (now part of the Drexel University College of Medicine) and performed her internship and residency at Philadelphia General Hospital, where she met her future husband, the physician Eric Reiss. The couple first moved to San Antonio, Texas, then relocated to St. Louis after Eric Reiss received an appointment at the Washington University School of Medicine. Hired by the St. Louis city health department, Reiss was involved in inoculating children with the polio vaccine.

== Baby Tooth Survey ==
In 1959, Reiss and her husband joined environmental scientist Barry Commoner and others to create the Greater St. Louis Citizens' Committee for Nuclear Information, which initiated the Baby Tooth Survey in conjunction with Saint Louis University and the Washington University School of Dental Medicine as a means of determining the effects of nuclear fallout on the human anatomy. Reiss led the project from 1959 to 1961. The research focused on detecting the presence of strontium-90, a cancer-causing radioactive isotope created by the more than 400 atomic tests conducted above ground before 1963. Due to its chemical similarity to calcium, the radioactive strontium isotope is absorbed from water and dairy products into the bones and teeth of children, as their growing bodies need calcium. Visiting local schools and organizations, she convinced parents to have their children send in their lost baby teeth, in return for which they were sent a button reading "I gave my tooth to science". The team sent collection forms to area schools, and teeth were initially sent to the Reiss home, where they were sorted. In all, some 320,000 teeth from children of various ages were collected before the project was ended in 1970.

The results of the thousands of teeth analyzed, published in the November 24, 1961, issue of the journal Science, revealed elevated levels of radioactive compounds in the first sets of teeth that had been collected. President John F. Kennedy was made aware of the research results while he was negotiating a treaty with the United Kingdom and Soviet Union to place controls on nuclear testing. His call to the Reiss home was answered by her son; the person on the other end of the phone said, "This is John Kennedy, can I talk to your mom?" Further analysis by the team led to the conclusion that children born in 1963 had absorbed levels of strontium-90 that were 50 times higher than those found in children born a decade earlier. Her husband, Eric Reiss, testified before the United States Senate when it was considering ratification of the Partial Nuclear Test Ban Treaty. Later research showed that levels of strontium-90 in the cohort born in 1968, after the treaty had gone into effect, had declined by 50 percent.

== Death ==
A resident of Pinecrest, Florida, Reiss died at the age of 90 at her home on January 1, 2011, after suffering a myocardial infarction two months earlier. She was survived by her son, Eric Reiss, as well as by two grandchildren and three great-grandchildren.
