= Radiological and Environmental Sciences Laboratory =

US research laboratory

Coordinates: 43°30′57″N 112°02′06″W

The Radiological and Environmental Sciences Laboratory (RESL) is a government-owned and government-operated laboratory operated by the United States Department of Energy Idaho Operations Office. It reports directly to the DOE-ID Assistant Manager for Technical Programs and Operations, and is located at the IRC in Idaho Falls, Idaho. RESL and its predecessor organizations have been part of the DOE-ID since 1949.

RESL provides an unbiased technical component to DOE oversight of contractor operations at DOE facilities and sites. As a reference laboratory, it conducts cost-effective measurement quality assurance programs that help assure that key DOE missions are completed in a safe and environmentally responsible manner. By assuring the quality and stability of key laboratory measurement systems throughout DOE, and by providing expert technical assistance to improve those systems and programs, it assures the reliability of data on which decisions are based. As a result, customers and stakeholders have greater confidence that those programs protect workers, the public, and the environment.

RESL's core scientific capabilities are in analytical chemistry and radiation calibrations and measurements. The RESL staff includes professional chemists, physicists, health physicists, engineers, computer programmers, and technicians, many of whom have advanced degrees. Their professional involvement includes participating in professional society activities, acting as reviewers and participating on working groups and committees for organizations such as the American Society for Testing and Materials, the Health Physics Society, the American Chemical Society, the Council on Ionizing Radiation Measurements and Standards, the American Water Works Association, the American National Standards Institute, and the International Organization for Standardization.

Constructed in 1951, the original RESL facility was demolished in 2018, and a "behemoth midcentury radiation detector" weighing 55 tons and located in the structure was "salvaged for modern use because of its invaluably rare material composition".
