= Radiation angle =

Half the vertex angle of the cone of light emitted at the exit face of an optical fiber

In fiber optics, the radiation angle is half the vertex angle of the cone of light emitted at the exit face of an optical fiber.

The cone boundary is usually defined (a) by the angle at which the far-field irradiance has decreased to a specified fraction of its maximum value or (b) as the cone within which there is a specified fraction of the total radiated power at any point in the far field.

== See also ==
- Guided ray
- Numerical aperture
