= Ernest J. Sternglass =

German-American physicist and author

- Born: Ernest Joachim Sternglass; 24 September 1923; Berlin, Germany
- Died: 12 February 2015 (aged 91); Ithaca, New York, United States
- Scientific career
- Fields: Physics
- Workplaces: Naval Ordnance Laboratory; Westinghouse Research Laboratories; University of Pittsburgh; Radiation and Public Health Project

Ernest Joachim Sternglass (24 September 1923 – 12 February 2015) was a professor emeritus at the University of Pittsburgh and director of the Radiation and Public Health Project. He was an American physicist and author, best known for his controversial research on the health risks of low-level radiation from atmospheric testing of nuclear weapons and from nuclear power plants.

== Early life ==
Both of his parents were physicians. When Ernest was fourteen, the Sternglass family left Germany in 1938 to avoid the Nazi regime. He completed high school at the age of sixteen, then entered Cornell, registering for an engineering program.

Financial difficulties encountered by his family forced him to leave school for a year. By the time he returned to Cornell, the U.S. had entered World War II. Sternglass volunteered for the navy. He was about to ship out when the atomic bomb was detonated over Hiroshima. After the war Sternglass married.

== Research career ==
In Washington, D.C. he worked as a civilian employee at the Naval Ordnance Laboratory, which researched military weapons. Sternglass began studying night vision devices, which led him to work with radiation. In 1947, his first son was born, and he had the opportunity to meet Albert Einstein. They discussed his results which suggested a low energy creation of neutrons, a work that came to be rediscovered four decades later.

From 1952 to 1967 Sternglass worked at the Westinghouse Research Laboratory. Early in his time at Westinghouse, he proposed a technology for image intensification. He also published a formula for interplanetary dust charging, which is still used extensively. All his work there involved nuclear instrumentation. At first he studied fluoroscopy, which "exposes an individual to a considerable dose of radiation." Then he worked on a new kind of television tube for satellites. Eventually, he was put in charge of the Lunar Station program at Westinghouse. During his time at Westinghouse, he worked on a wide range of projects, including applying magnetohydrodynamics to gas-cooled reactor systems, and helping to develop the video cameras used in Project Apollo.

In 1967, Sternglass moved to the department of radiology at the University of Pittsburgh School of Medicine, where he eventually was named professor emeritus. While there, through the early 1990s, he led pioneering work on the development of digital X-ray technology for medical imaging.

Sternglass was director, co-founder, and chief technical officer of the Radiation and Public Health Project (RPHP). He died of heart failure on 12 February 2015, in Ithaca, New York.

== Claims of radiation harm ==
In the early 1960s Sternglass became aware of the work of Alice Stewart. Stewart was head of the department of preventive medicine of Oxford University, responsible for a pioneering study on the effects of low-level radiation in England. Stewart had discovered that a small amount of radiation to an unborn child could double the child's chances for leukemia and cancer.

In the 1960s, Sternglass studied the effect of nuclear fallout on infants and children. He claimed not only an increase in leukemia and cancer, but a significant increase in infant mortality. In 1963 he published the paper "Cancer: Relation of Prenatal Radiation to Development of the Disease in Childhood" in the journal Science.

In 1963, Sternglass testified before the congressional Joint Committee on Atomic Energy regarding the level of strontium-90 found in children as part of the Baby Tooth Survey. The result of bomb-test fallout, strontium-90, was associated with increased childhood leukemia. His studies played a role in the Partial Test Ban Treaty signed by President John F. Kennedy.

In 1969, Sternglass reached the conclusion that 400,000 infants had died because of medical problems caused by fallout—chiefly lowered resistance to disease and reductions in birth weight. In an article in Esquire, he claimed that the fallout from the nuclear explosions of an Anti-ballistic missile (ABM) system would kill all children in the U.S. (This claim was distorted by Dixy Lee Ray in 1989, asserting that Sternglass had said this of all nuclear weapons testing, in an op-ed in which she also dismissed anthropogenic global warming as "the current scare".) Freeman Dyson, taking up the debate over ABM systems in the pages of Bulletin of the Atomic Scientists, disagreed with Sternglass, although he admitted

The evidence is not sufficient to prove Sternglass is right [but] the essential point is that Sternglass may be right. The margin of uncertainty in the effects of world-wide fallout is so large that we have no justification for dismissing Sternglass's numbers as fantastic."

In 1971, Sternglass claimed that infant mortality rates increased in communities living in close proximity to nuclear industrial facilities. His study included several nuclear power plants and a nuclear fuel reprocessing facility. He claimed that when setting allowable limits for nuclear industrial emissions "the AEC grossly misjudged the sensitivity of the fetus."

In 1974, Sternglass identified elevated levels of radiation and increased cancer and infant mortality incidence in Shippingport, Pennsylvania. This prompted a scientific review initiated by Pennsylvania governor, Milton Shapp. The review concluded that "it was impossible to rule out the fact that there may have been a relationship between environmental radiation exposure from the Shippingport operation and an increased death rate in the population."

In 1979, Sternglass began extending his analyses of fallout effects to embrace behavioral disorders, including academic deficits seen in high school students. Later he was to blame radioactivity for higher crime rates and higher AIDS mortality.

== Critical responses ==
Alice Stewart, whose work was the inspiration for the work of Sternglass on radiation health effects, firmly repudiated it, saying of an encounter with him in 1969:

Sternglass had been tremendously excited about our findings [....] But he had exaggerated what we'd said, grossly exaggerated, and we comment on this in the New Scientist. He's said that we'd shown that fetal x-rays had doubled the infant mortality rate, when all we'd said was you'd doubled the chance of a child's dying from cancer. Well, the difference is that one is measured in thousands and the other in single figures [....] Sternglass was a supporter of our work, but he had got our figures very wrong, and we couldn't have our statistics misused like that.

A review in Bulletin of the Atomic Scientists of Sternglass's 1972 Low-Level Radiation lauded the author for bringing the risks (and the nuclear industry's reluctance to discuss them openly) to public attention, with a relatively "calm presentation" compared to other recent titles, however, the reviewers sided more with Stewart on methodology, saying that it was

... over-confident in its manner of reaching conclusions. [....] his method is to [...] to amass many instances of events under various conditions, necessarily uncontrolled, that seem to corroborate the same trend. [...] it seems likely that he has exercised some selectivity, emphasizing favorable cases over those showing no distinct trend. [....] his work should be but a beginning.

The book The Phantom Fallout - Induced Cancer Epidemic in Southwestern Utah / Downwinders Deluded and Waiting to Die by Daniel Miles repeatedly examines the claims made by Sternglass, and (with extensive documentation) finds them based entirely on cherry-picked data, with extensive application of selective neglect of any data that contradicts his position, and some outright falsified data. According to Miles, there is zero evidence for any increases in cancer in general, leukemia in particular, or other medical ills referable to exposure to the (documented in his book as trivial... in most cases a fraction of low normal background radiation) exposures to radiation from atmospheric bomb testing in New Mexico, Utah, and Nevada in the 1950s and 60s. The only credible case of humans harmed by radioactive fallout, Mr. Miles states, is that of some Japanese fishermen on "The Fortunate Dragon" and some nearby Pacific islanders, in the face of a thermonuclear bomb test 1000 times more powerful than any of the USwestern desert small atomic bomb atmospheric tests, and spewing 1000 times or more as much radioactive material.

== Three Mile Island ==
In April 1979, Sternglass was invited to testify to Congressional hearings on the Three Mile Island accident. Two days later, when the hearings were moved from the House to the Senate, he was told his testimony was no longer desired. Sternglass believed that an effort was being made to suppress any evidence about possible deaths as a result of the accident. In a paper presented at an engineering and architecture congress, Sternglass argued that an excess of 430 infant deaths in the U.S. northeast that summer could largely be attributed to Three Mile Island radiation releases. This led some writers on environmental issues to claim that he had proven that figure as a minimum.

Sternglass's methodology was criticized—including by the medical researcher who provided him with the statistics (Gordon MacLeod), and by an otherwise-sympathetic researcher with the Natural Resources Defense Council (Arthur Tamplin) -- on several counts:

- for not attaining statistical significance (Frank Greenberg, Centers for Disease Control and Prevention, CDC);
- for lacking a sufficient baseline, since screening for hypothyroidism hadn't started until 1978 (Greenberg)
- for not looking at the number of babies who didn't die (Gary Stein, CDC);
- for not noticing that the sex ratio of newborns hadn't changed—males being more susceptible to fetal injury than females (Stein; George Tokuhata, Pennsylvania Health Department, director of epidemiology),
- for "ignoring [areas for analysis] close to the reactor, where the infant mortality was very low" (Tokuhata);
- for simply being incomplete (Tamplin).

As well, he had relied on figures that had incorrectly compounded fetal deaths with infant mortality (Tokuhata).

== Cosmological theories ==
Sternglass also wrote the book Before the Big Bang: the Origins of the Universe, in which he offers an argument for the Lemaître theory of the primeval atom. He offers technical data showing the plausibility of an original super massive relativistic electron-positron pair. This particle contained the entire mass of the universe and through a series of 270 divisions created everything that now exists. If true, this would help ameliorate some of the problems with the current models, namely inflation and black hole singularities.

== Books ==
- Ernest J. Sternglass (1981) Secret Fallout: low-level radiation from Hiroshima to Three-Mile Island. ISBN 0-07-061242-0. Originally published in 1972 under the title Low-Level Radiation with an introduction by Nobel Laureate George Wald.
- Ernest J. Sternglass (1997) Before the Big Bang: the origins of the universe. ISBN 1-56858-087-8.

== See also ==
- Downwinders
- Radiation Exposure Compensation Act
- Background radiation
- Ionizing radiation
- Radiation poisoning
- Radioactive contamination
- Health physics
- National Committee for a Sane Nuclear Policy
- John Gofman
