= Baby Tooth Survey =

1961 study of radioactive fallout

The Baby Tooth Survey was a means of determining the effects of nuclear fallout in the human anatomy by examining the levels of radioactive material absorbed into the deciduous teeth of children. It was initiated by the Greater St. Louis Citizens' Committee for Nuclear Information in conjunction with Saint Louis University and the Washington University School of Dental Medicine.

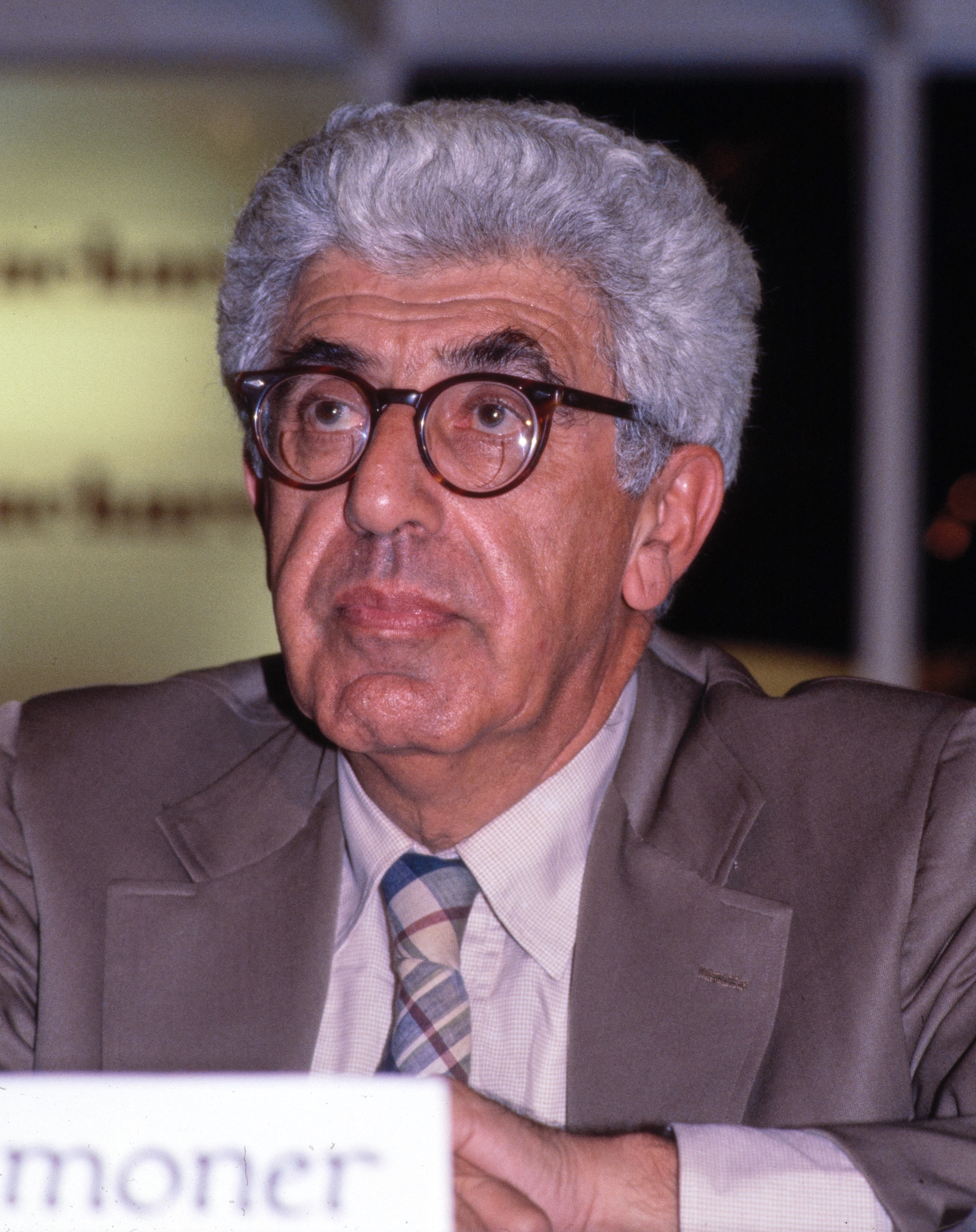
Dr. Barry Commoner, one of the founding scientists of the Baby Tooth Survey

Beginning in December of 1958, the survey was founded by the husband and wife team of physicians Eric and Louise Reiss, along with other scientists such as Barry Commoner and Ursula Franklin. The research focused on detecting the presence of strontium-90, a cancer-causing radioactive isotope created by the more than 400 atomic tests conducted above ground. Strontium-90 is absorbed from water and dairy products into the bones and teeth given its chemical similarity to calcium. The team sent collection forms to schools in the St. Louis area, hoping to gather 50,000 teeth each year. The school-aged children were encouraged to mail in their newly lost baby teeth by colorful posters displayed in classrooms, and the reward of a colorful button. Ultimately over 320,000 teeth were donated by children of various ages. The project continued for 12 years, eventually ending in 1970.

Preliminary results published by the team in the November 24, 1961, edition of the journal Science showed that levels of strontium-90 in children had risen steadily in children born in the 1950s, with those born later showing the most increased levels. The results of a more comprehensive study of the elements found in the teeth collected showed that children born in 1963 had levels of strontium-90 in their baby teeth that were 50 times higher than those found in children born in 1950, before the advent of large-scale atomic testing. The findings helped convince U.S. President John F. Kennedy to sign the Partial Nuclear Test Ban Treaty with the United Kingdom and Soviet Union, which ended the above-ground nuclear weapons testing which placed large amounts of nuclear fallout into the atmosphere.

== Background ==
According to Irish scientist Kathleen Lonsdale, in the mid-1950s it was known that strontium-90 is taken up particularly easily by children due to their growing bones. It was recognized that strontium-90 can cause bone tumors, and according to the British and American official reports, "some children in both countries have already accumulated a measurable amount of radioactive strontium in their bodies."

Strontium-90 is taken up by the body in a similar way to calcium. Sr-90 fallout is absorbed by plants eaten by dairy cows, leading to Sr-90 ending up in milk. In Project Sunshine in the early-mid 1950s, the Atomic Energy Commission (AEC) began analyzing milk in various parts of the country to test for Sr-90 contents. After the results of Project Sunshine were published in 1956, the United States Public Health Service labeled St. Louis as a hot-spot for Sr-90. This greatly concerned mothers in St. Louis, since milk was a primary source of calcium for their children. The trend of St. Louis having a high concentration of Sr-90 in its milk continued into 1957 and 1958, when St. Louis had the highest amount of Sr-90 of ten cities surveyed. Women in St. Louis started raising public awareness about how nuclear weapons tests affected the public. Basing their activism on the foundations of motherhood, they reasoned that nuclear weapons testing was their concern because it affected their children and because they were responsible for the well-being of their homes. In 1958, the people of St. Louis, primarily the women, formed the Greater St. Louis Citizens’ Committee for Nuclear Information (CNI), a bipartisan group of both citizens and scientists designed to inform the public on the effects of nuclear weapons testing.

In an article published in 1958 in Nature, a British science and technology journal, Dr. Herman Kalckar, a biochemist at Johns Hopkins University, explained that to find out more about how the human body uptakes radioactive elements, research should be done on the elements present in a child's first set of teeth. This idea was brought to the CNI in 1958, who then started the Baby Tooth Survey in St. Louis with help from a scientific advisory group from the St. Louis and Washington University Schools of Dentistry. They needed to collect roughly 50,000 deciduous teeth per year to get adequate data. The survey was funded by a grant from the United States Public Health Service, with additional funding provided by the Leukemia Guild of Missouri and Illinois.

== Results ==
With teeth from many children not exclusively in the St. Louis Area but also within a 100-mile radius, the teeth collected were separated by tooth type and analyzed from there. The collection of teeth was separated by factors that might affect the levels of both Calcium and Strontium-90, like whether the child was breast fed or formula fed, residences of the mother during pregnancy and residence of the child during their infancy. From around the beginning of the survey in 1951 to 1954, Strontium-90 level concentration in teeth shows an upwards curve and increase exponentially over just the 3 years. A rough average of 0.17 micromicrocuries of Strontium-90 for every 1 gram of Calcium in the teeth in 1951. The year 1952 had similar results but still a growth in Strontium-90, to about 0.20 micromicrocuries, forming an estimated baseline of the effects of radiation in children. By 1954 the averages increased even more, to about 0.57 micromicrocuries for every gram of Calcium, showing the correlation between radiation presence in soil and in children's diets, and inevitably, bones.

== Follow-up analysis ==
A set of 85,000 teeth that had been uncovered in storage in 2001 by Washington University were given to the Radiation and Public Health Project. By tracking 3,000 individuals who had participated in the tooth-collection project, the RPHP published results that showed that the 12 children who later died of cancer before the age of 50 had levels of strontium-90 in their stored baby teeth that were twice the levels of those who were still alive at 50. The U.S. Nuclear Regulatory Commission reports that these finding are seriously flawed and that the Radiation and Public Health Project has not followed good scientific practice in the conducting of these studies. In particular, they claim that the Radiation and Public Health Project confused correlation for causation and incorrectly conflated risk from nuclear weapon testing fallout with radiation from nuclear power plants.

== Legislative impact ==
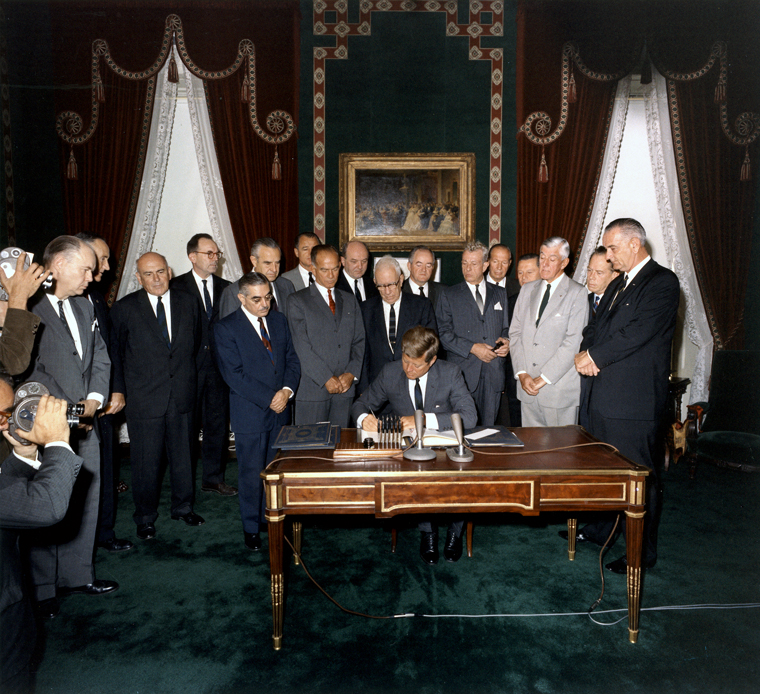
Signing of the Nuclear Test Ban Treaty in 1963

The preliminary results in 1961 of the Baby Tooth Survey found that strontium-90 levels in deciduous teeth had almost tripled since the start of nuclear testing. Strontium-90 has been documented as a carcinogen and has been confirmed to cause cancer in animals such as mice, rats, rabbits, and dogs. These findings have led scientists to conclude that strontium-90 likely causes cancer in humans. These results led to citizens organizing to protest the issue of above ground nuclear testing, citing the results of the Baby Tooth Survey as a key reason for change. These results were then shared with President John F. Kennedy. Upon seeing the results of the St. Louis Baby Tooth Survey, Kennedy signed the Partial Nuclear Test Ban Treaty in 1963 to end above ground nuclear testing.

== Ethical consideration and public participation ==
The Baby Tooth Survey raised questions about how research should be done, especially when it involves children. A large concern was whether or not parents fully understood what they were agreeing to. The collection of children's teeth also raised privacy concerns. Since the survey involved sensitive information, the participants' identities had to be protected and the results shared carefully. On the other hand, the survey served as an example of public participation in science. It allowed people to participate by sending in baby teeth to determine how nuclear testing affected radiation levels. This kind of public involvement is an early example of “citizen science”, where regular people collected information for research. By participating, the public helped raise awareness about the dangers of radiation and encouraged action against nuclear testing. The survey showed how involving the public in science can lead to change and make governments take responsibility for health risks caused by their actions.

== Related projects ==
The Baby Tooth Survey inspired a number of similar initiatives in other parts of the world. For example, what became known as the Tooth Fairy Project was developed in South Africa by Dr. Anthony Turton and his team at the Council for Scientific and Industrial Research (CSIR) in order to determine whether human health impacts arising from radioactivity and heavy metal pollution downstream from gold mining activities, driven by acid mine drainage, was occurring.

A number of related studies by the Radiation and Public Health Project assert that levels of radioactive strontium-90 (Sr-90) are rising in the environment and that these increased levels are responsible for increases in cancers, particularly cancers in children, and infant mortality. The group also made the claim that radioactive effluents from nuclear power plants are directly responsible for the increases in Sr-90. In one study, researchers reported that Sr-90 concentrations in baby teeth are higher in areas around nuclear power plants than in other areas. However, numerous peer-reviewed, scientific studies do not substantiate such claims. This has also sometimes been referred to as “The Tooth Fairy Project.”

In early 1970s, Herbert Needleman used baby teeth in the same way that Barry Commoner did but for testing lead levels instead of strontium-90.

Dr. Mona Hanna-Attisha, a pediatrician who helped expose the Flint Water Crisis in Flint, Michigan in 2015, has been promoting a similar study to track lead levels in the local children. Per the news coverage, "She expects the forthcoming report to include information on the initial results of brain assessments of children exposed to Flint water and early results of testing baby teeth of Flint children to measure their exposure to lead."

== Documentary ==
This project is discussed in the documentary film, Silent Fallout.

== See also ==
- Downwinders
