= List of telecommunications terminology =

This is a List of telecommunications terminology and acronyms which relate to telecommunications.

== C ==
- Coded set
- Customer office terminal

== D ==
- Data forwarder
- Digital multiplex hierarchy
- Duplex

== E ==
- Exempted addressee

== F ==
- Frame synchronization
- Free-space optical communication
- Functional profile

== G ==
- Group alerting and dispatching system

== H ==
- Hop
- Horn
- Hybrid routing

== M ==
- Mechanically induced modulation
- Micro-mainframe link
- Multiplexing

== N ==
- Noise (signal processing)

== P ==
- Plesiochronous digital hierarchy
- Primary station

== R ==
- Radio receiver
- Ringaround

== S ==
- Spatial application

== T ==
- Transmission medium
- Transmitter

== W ==
- Wireless mobility management

== See also ==
- Federal Standard 1037C
- List of telecommunications encryption terms
- Outline of telecommunication
- Telecommunications
