= Outline of telecommunication =

Overview of and topical guide to telecommunication

The following outline is provided as an overview of and topical guide to telecommunication:

Telecommunication – the transmission of signals over a distance for the purpose of communication. In modern times, this process almost always involves the use of electromagnetic waves by transmitters and receivers, but in earlier years it also involved the use of drums and visual signals such as smoke, fire, beacons, semaphore lines and other optical communications.

== Modes of telecommunication ==
- E-mail
- Fax
- Instant messaging
- Radio
- Satellite
- SMS
- Telegraphy
- Telephony
- Television
- Television broadcasting
- mobile telephony
- Videoconferencing
- VoIP
- Voicemail

== Types of telecommunication networks ==
Telecommunications network

- Computer networks
  - ARPANET
  - Ethernet
  - Internet
  - Wireless networks
- Public switched telephone networks (PSTN)
- Packet switched networks
- Radio network
- Broadband
- Wireless Broadband

== Aspects of telecommunication transmission ==
Telecommunication

- Analog
- Digital
- Functional profile
- Optics

=== Telecommunication technology ===
- Modulation
  - Amplitude modulation
  - Frequency modulation
  - Quadrature amplitude modulation
- Nyquist rate
- Nyquist ISI criterion
- Pulse shaping
- Intersymbol interference

=== Communications media types ===
- Physical media for Telecommunication
  - Twisted pair
  - Coaxial cable
  - Optical fiber
- Telecommunication through Free Space
  - Broadcast radio frequency including television and radio
  - Line-of-sight
    - Communications satellite
    - Terrestrial Microwave
    - Wireless LAN

=== Relationship between media and transmitters ===
- Physical access to media
  - Simplex
  - Duplex (telecommunications)
- Logical relationships
  - Return channel
  - Two-way alternating
  - Two-way simultaneous

=== Multiple access to media ===
- Multiplexing
  - Analog
    - Frequency division multiplexing
    - Space division multiplexing
  - Digital
    - Time-division multiplexing
    - Statistical multiplexing and Packet switching
  - Media Access Control
    - Contention
    - Token-based
      - Centralized token control
      - Distributed token control

== History of telecommunication ==
History of telecommunication

- History of telegraphy
- History of the telephone

- Invention of the telephone
- Timeline of the telephone

- History of radio
- History of television
- History of videophones
- History of mobile phones
- History of computing hardware
- History of the Internet

== Major telecommunications equipment manufacturers ==
- Alcatel-Lucent – French global telecommunications equipment company
- Aricent – Former company
- AT&T – American telecommunications company
- Avaya – American technology company
- Ciena – American telecommunications company
- Cisco Systems – American multinational technology company
- Ericsson – Swedish telecommunications company
- Fujitsu – Japanese multinational technology company
- HCL Technologies – Indian multinational technology company
- Huawei – Chinese multinational technology company
- NEC – Japanese technology corporation
- Nokia – Multinational data networking and telecommunications equipment company
- ShoreTel – US telecommunications company
- Verizon – American telecommunications company
- ZTE – Chinese telecommunications company

== Major telecommunications service providers ==
- List of mobile network operators
- List of telephone operating companies

== Telecommunication organizations ==
- Alliance for Telecommunications Industry Solutions
- Telecommunications Industry Association

== Telecommunication publications ==
Magazines

- Billing and OSS World
- Cabling Installation & Maintenance
- Call Center
- Communications News
- Communications System Design
- Lightwave
- Mobile Radio Technology (MRT)
- New Telephony
- Phone+
- RCR Wireless News
- Telecom Asia
- Telecommunications Magazine
- Telephony
- WhatSatphone Magazine
- Wireless Systems Design
- Wireless Week
- Xchange

== Persons influential in telecommunication ==
- Edwin Howard Armstrong – American radio-frequency engineer and inventor (1890–1954)
- John Logie Baird – Scottish inventor (1888–1946)
- Paul Baran – American-Jewish engineer (1926–2011)
- Alexander Graham Bell – Inventor of the telephone (1847–1922)
- Tim Berners-Lee – English computer scientist (born 1955)
- Jagadish Chandra Bose – Physicist, biologist and botanist (1857–1937)
- Vint Cerf – American computer scientist and Internet pioneer (born 1943)
- Claude Chappe – Late 18th-century French inventor
- Donald Davies – British computer scientist (1924–2000)
- Louis Pouzin – French computer scientist and Internet pioneer (born 1931)
- Lee de Forest – American inventor (1873–1961)
- Philo Farnsworth – American inventor (1906–1971)
- Reginald Fessenden – Canadian-American electrical engineer and inventor (1866–1932)
- Elisha Gray – American electrical engineer (1835–1901)
- Innocenzo Manzetti – Italian inventor (1826–1877)
- Guglielmo Marconi – Italian electrical engineer and inventor (1874–1937)
- Antonio Meucci – Italian inventor (1808–1889)
- Alexander Stepanovich Popov – Russian physicist (1859–1906)
- Johann Philipp Reis – German scientist and inventor
- Almon Brown Strowger – American inventor of the telephone exchange (1839–1902)
- Nikola Tesla – Serbian-American engineer and inventor (1856–1943)
- Camille Tissot – French physicist (1868–1917)
- Alfred Vail – 19th-century American machinist and inventor
- Charles Wheatstone – English physicist and inventor (1802–1875)
- Vladimir K. Zworykin – Russian-American engineer (1888–1982)

== See also ==
- List of telecommunications encryption terms
- List of telecommunications terminology
- List of telephony terminology
