= Federal Standard 1037C =

United States Federal Standard

Federal Standard 1037C, titled Telecommunications: Glossary of Telecommunication Terms, is a United States Federal Standard issued by the General Services Administration pursuant to the Federal Property and Administrative Services Act of 1949, as amended.

This document provides federal departments and agencies with a comprehensive source of definitions of terms used in telecommunications and directly related fields by international and U.S. government telecommunications specialists.

As a publication of the U.S. government, prepared by an agency of the U.S. government, it appears to be mostly available as a public domain resource, but a few items are derived from copyrighted sources: where this is the case, there is an attribution to the source.

This standard was superseded in 2001 by American National Standard (ANSI) T1.523-2001, Telecom Glossary 2000, which is published by ATIS. The old standard is still frequently used, because the new standard is protected by copyright, as usual for ANSI standards.

A newer proposed standard is the "ATIS Telecom Glossary 2011", ATIS-0100523.2011.

== See also ==
- Automatic message exchange
- Bilateral synchronization
- Encryption
- List of telecommunications encryption terms
- List of telecommunications terminology
- Net operation
- Online and offline
