= MicroMainframe =

The designation Micromainframe (also rendered as MicroMainframe or Micro-mainframe) may refer to:

- The Commodore PET SuperPET 9000 series microcomputer
- The Intel iAPX 432 multiple-chip microprocessor

== See also ==
- Micro-mainframe link
