= List of countries by telecommunications equipment exports =

The following is a list of countries by telecommunications equipment exports, using the Harmonised System code 8525.

== International Trade Centre ==
Data is for 2024, in thousands of United States dollars and tons/units.

List of countries by telecommunications equipment exports (2024)
Country	Value exported (thousands USD)	Trade balance (thousands USD)	Quantity exported	
Country	Value exported (thousands USD)	Trade balance (thousands USD)	Value	Units
World	52,922,111	−2,360,863	–	–
China	13,968,596	11,594,291	178,236	Tons
Vietnam	5,022,500	4,400,596	–	–
Germany	4,053,345	401,334	8,528	Tons
United States	3,810,365	−8,126,759	18,170,135	Units
Hong Kong	2,917,682	−453,787	34,418,270	Units
Thailand	2,860,833	2,281,449	34,012,043	Units
Japan	2,565,392	−335,665	3,787	Tons
Netherlands	2,387,256	349,896	17,832	Tons
Taiwan	1,155,830	643,541	5,415	Tons
Mexico	1,118,302	52,111	–	–
Poland	1,116,388	228,927	3,287	Tons
Canada	1,046,221	−981,582	–	–
United Kingdom	967,462	−898,090	2,342	Tons
Singapore	880,145	9,890	10,542,010	Units
Hungary	765,278	240,754	–	–
South Korea	757,426	−225,566	3,121	Tons
Czech Republic	754,430	−36,422	–	–
Malaysia	622,161	139,550	8,926,047	Units
France	621,991	−519,293	2,554	Tons
Belgium	536,978	−299,449	6,230	Tons
Israel	472,380	180,759	–	–
Sweden	320,960	−129,435	898,703	Units
Romania	290,484	−65,594	–	–
Italy	289,531	−453,249	2,084	Tons
Denmark	268,330	−236,286	753	Tons
United Arab Emirates	257,938	−773,536	–	–
Ireland	212,917	91,830	361	Tons
Spain	209,248	−574,696	1,780	Tons
Morocco	208,100	101,719	–	–
Portugal	185,778	65,026	1,121	Tons
Norway	174,153	−10,422	436	Tons
Austria	171,499	−145,375	578	Tons
Slovakia	161,965	−185,175	1,343	Tons
Australia	161,448	−940,886	1,763,022	Units
Indonesia	160,743	−144,478	847	Tons
Switzerland	159,725	−209,620	210	Tons
Estonia	154,704	62,005	289	Tons
India	143,666	−1,961,021	1,346,550	Units
Myanmar	123,503	98,915	1,369,958	Units
Latvia	113,662	41,310	170	Tons
Panama	80,383	−23,495	2,012	Tons
Bulgaria	73,060	−6,855	738	Tons
Turkey	62,150	−493,369	570	Tons
Philippines	57,434	−50,769	483	Tons
Slovenia	56,153	−19,127	168	Tons
South Africa	45,811	−140,852	1,162,353	Units
Finland	41,896	−88,179	91	Tons
Laos	39,083	24,426	–	–
Lithuania	38,941	−24,947	205	Tons
Chile	23,436	−104,079	43,736	Units
Kazakhstan	23,192	−58,581	183	Tons
Saudi Arabia	19,831	−326,048	90	Tons
Colombia	19,171	−117,010	58	Tons
Greece	18,264	−58,602	364	Tons
New Zealand	17,591	−117,780	82	Tons
Croatia	14,915	−41,465	40	Tons
Ukraine	12,717	−1,657,088	118	Tons
Brazil	11,147	−260,229	110	Tons
Serbia	11,033	−25,785	36	Tons
Russia	9,421	−284,192	–	–
Bahrain	6,109	−3,622	–	–
Luxembourg	5,697	−16,779	35	Tons
Cyprus	5,118	−8,551	7	Tons
Qatar	4,968	−67,537	–	–
Armenia	2,617	−12,275	9	Tons
Sri Lanka	2,361	−17,175	4,438	Units
Bahamas	2,322	−3,104	65,017	Units
Brunei	1,921	−703	361	Units
Cameroon	1,878	−1,453	–	–
Jordan	1,859	−18,513	–	–
Uzbekistan	1,845	−33,796	27,801	Units
Costa Rica	1,765	−38,808	12	Tons
Fiji	1,749	−2,670	–	–
Pakistan	1,624	−27,151	906	Units
Antigua and Barbuda	1,551	919	5	Tons
Peru	1,490	−89,116	9	Tons
Kuwait	1,349	−18,680	39	Tons
Ecuador	1,272	−38,026	4	Tons
Georgia	1,057	−37,434	3	Tons
Trinidad and Tobago	1,055	−8,299	34	Tons
Barbados	1,033	−4,173	34	Tons
Malta	1,014	−6,469	1	Tons
Algeria	903	−24,096	1	Tons
North Macedonia	879	−25,208	3	Tons
Dominican Republic	873	−53,963	10	Tons
Grenada	841	−1,215	–	–
Mauritius	752	−2,112	–	–
Angola	751	−13,182	4	Tons
Turkmenistan	749	−4,425	–	–
Iran	707	−8,282	–	–
El Salvador	689	−12,456	8	Tons
Tunisia	654	−10,384	–	–
Sao Tome and Principe	650	422	–	–
Bosnia and Herzegovina	648	−14,364	3	Tons
Bangladesh	639	−64,186	–	–
Macao	596	−154,616	7	Tons
Cambodia	555	−2,427	1	Tons
Somalia	552	−2,788	–	–
Côte d'Ivoire	545	−12,225	13	Tons
Saint Kitts and Nevis	519	−14	–	–
Guatemala	487	−32,436	20	Tons
Oman	467	−13,458	–	–
Senegal	455	−1,974	2	Tons
Iceland	409	−16,279	9	Tons
Belarus	403	−7,757	–	–
Mozambique	402	−3,256	–	–
Moldova	369	−11,085	1	Tons
Kenya	367	−24,724	5	Tons
Mali	338	−2,726	–	–
Ghana	334	−23,524	–	–
Uruguay	323	−20,160	7	Tons
Egypt	320	−51,461	–	–
Gibraltar	316	−477	4	Tons
Andorra	314	−13,490	–	–
Azerbaijan	269	−37,129	1	Tons
Eswatini	253	−861	–	–
Nigeria	248	−51,621	–	–
Venezuela	243	−25,181	–	–
Montenegro	222	−4,720	33	Tons
Zambia	217	−3,917	1	Tons
Mongolia	209	−14,237	–	–
Botswana	197	−4,538	5	Tons
Uganda	194	−4,937	31	Tons
Albania	193	−8,775	–	–
Argentina	171	−127,768	–	–
Faroe Islands	163	−2,861	1	Tons
Tanzania	163	−6,724	13	Tons
Curaçao	158	−4,485	–	–
Kyrgyzstan	135	−6,845	–	–
Guyana	133	−2,411	2	Tons
Benin	121	−1,252	–	–
Suriname	113	−2,845	2	Tons
Sierra Leone	108	−574	–	–
Lebanon	103	−7,587	4	Tons
Bermuda	102	−1,185	–	–
Timor-Leste	93	−351	–	–
Rwanda	92	−4,275	–	–
Namibia	89	−16,685	3	Tons
Afghanistan	85	−1,153	–	–
Bolivia	85	−10,657	–	–
Burkina Faso	66	−2,733	3	Tons
Papua New Guinea	63	−4,686	–	–
Paraguay	63	−97,297	3	Tons
Honduras	59	−14,100	2	Tons
Jamaica	48	−5,459	–	–
Zimbabwe	45	−8,072	2	Tons
Belize	36	−1,556	1	Tons
Iraq	34	−36,656	–	–
Malawi	34	−2,107	1	Tons
Mauritania	33	−1,369	–	–
Ethiopia	32	−9,088	–	–
Madagascar	29	−1,284	4	Tons
Nicaragua	29	−3,834	13	Tons
Burundi	28	−501	1	Tons
DR Congo	25	−15,457	–	–
Togo	20	−4,448	–	–
Yemen	20	−2,849	–	–
Sudan	19	−345	–	–
Bhutan	19	−972	61	Units
New Caledonia	19	−1,119	–	–
Syria	18	−17	–	–
Marshall Islands	17	−586	–	–
Cayman Islands	17	−1,908	–	–
Guinea	17	−3,058	1	Tons
Cocos (Keeling) Islands	15	15	–	–
North Korea	15	12	–	–
Turks and Caicos Islands	15	−903	–	–
Tonga	13	−244	–	–
Niger	13	−695	–	–
Nepal	13	−19,692	–	–
Greenland	12	−574	–	–
Solomon Islands	12	−112	38	Units
Congo	8	−2,641	–	–
Tokelau	8	8	–	–
Haiti	7	−596	–	–
Chad	7	−8,742	–	–
Nauru	7	−25	10	Units
Lesotho	6	−1,114	1	Tons
Libya	6	−8,705	–	–
Tuvalu	6	−32	–	–
Tajikistan	5	−15,707	–	–
United States Minor Outlying Islands	5	−2,535	–	–
Sint Maarten (Dutch part)	5	−248	–	–
Northern Mariana Islands	5	−29	–	–
Saint Lucia	3	−625	–	–
Saint Vincent and the Grenadines	3	−465	–	–
French Polynesia	3	−2,304	–	–
Gabon	2	−2,504	–	–
Niue	2	−126	–	–
South Sudan	2	−349	–	–
Seychelles	1	−843	1	Tons
Wallis and Futuna	1	−20	–	–
Norfolk Island	1	−68	–	–
Bonaire, Sint Eustatius and Saba	1	−62	–	–
Guinea-Bissau	1	−95	–	–
Cuba	1	−2,740	–	–

== Observatory of Economic Complexity ==
Data is for 2023, in United States dollars.

List of countries by telecommunications equipment exports (2023)
Country	Trade value
China	11,609,991,318
Vietnam	3,711,320,317
Germany	3,645,436,626
United States	3,552,910,584
Thailand	3,441,307,140
Japan	3,054,777,330
Taiwan	1,651,902,633
Netherlands	1,507,221,121
Canada	1,155,521,714
Mexico	961,176,923
South Korea	938,659,505
Malaysia	863,203,157
Poland	789,934,075
United Kingdom	667,141,139
Hungary	589,513,635
Czechia	542,231,154
Sweden	529,522,720
France	522,338,975
Hong Kong	522,314,431
Singapore	468,915,705
Philippines	310,251,134
Italy	308,057,728
Indonesia	287,830,346
United Arab Emirates	281,018,544
Israel	272,929,050
Ireland	268,951,831
Romania	259,186,992
Portugal	177,365,639
Spain	169,933,089
Austria	160,939,843
Belgium	152,314,536
Denmark	139,378,089
India	122,096,479
Australia	112,974,151
Switzerland	110,803,073
Morocco	107,853,403
Norway	105,298,680
Myanmar	100,568,901
Slovakia	90,694,393
Turkey	74,004,758
Bulgaria	60,853,785
South Africa	56,705,633
Estonia	49,764,504
Laos	45,162,663
Latvia	40,377,939
Slovenia	37,089,292
Lithuania	34,950,031
Finland	27,984,361
New Zealand	17,369,750
Colombia	17,019,933
Russia	16,156,819
Greece	14,113,877
Kazakhstan	13,984,359
Croatia	10,781,745
Cambodia	10,627,989
Saudi Arabia	10,072,915
Luxembourg	9,185,076
Serbia	8,389,576
Brazil	7,594,067
Oman	5,913,301
Ukraine	5,550,010
Armenia	5,103,296
Tunisia	4,763,099
Panama	4,671,677
Qatar	4,586,076
Chile	4,421,701
Malta	4,014,826
Bangladesh	3,332,017
Georgia	3,300,249
Cyprus	3,296,856
Bosnia and Herzegovina	2,630,447
Macau	2,407,460
Dominican Republic	2,308,578
Kyrgyzstan	2,188,464
Bahrain	2,154,772
Egypt	2,083,470
Costa Rica	1,945,894
Jordan	1,513,574
Nigeria	1,447,482
Pakistan	1,412,318
Uganda	1,335,822
Curacao	1,312,966
Fiji	1,294,851
North Macedonia	1,254,567
Seychelles	974,839
Peru	915,611
Uzbekistan	905,060
Albania	708,889
Iceland	645,012
Kenya	561,239
El Salvador	450,141
Mauritius	411,927
Mozambique	387,966
Montenegro	303,877
Cameroon	290,696
Botswana	284,630
Namibia	282,792
Kuwait	262,033
Cote d'Ivoire	256,093
Honduras	255,398
Guatemala	253,742
Azerbaijan	251,592
Sri Lanka	238,289
Venezuela	227,070
Trinidad and Tobago	225,445
Ethiopia	216,076
Argentina	202,931
Senegal	192,072
Saint Kitts and Nevis	185,603
Moldova	178,227
French Polynesia	176,607
Bolivia	170,461
Brunei	169,084
Jamaica	167,910
Bahamas	160,233
Andorra	155,812
Uruguay	153,901
Lebanon	153,326
Belarus	144,476
Iran	143,618
Paraguay	141,593
Djibouti	134,974
Ghana	130,255
Greenland	127,669
Ecuador	120,463
Iraq	118,644
Eswatini	117,000
Tanzania	110,064
Zambia	102,267
Gibraltar	95,291
Burkina Faso	92,453
Angola	87,454
Tajikistan	85,892
New Caledonia	85,601
Mali	85,044
Zimbabwe	83,584
Solomon Islands	81,394
Afghanistan	76,980
Nicaragua	74,799
DR Congo	62,481
Sierra Leone	61,818
Niger	59,063
Turks and Caicos Islands	51,955
Gabon	47,508
Maldives	33,851
Saint Martin	28,363
Papua New Guinea	28,329
Liberia	27,963
North Korea	27,811
Barbados	27,258
Mongolia	27,022
San Marino	26,723
Cayman Islands	25,120
Guyana	21,325
Rwanda	19,928
Gambia	19,265
Nauru	16,812
Bhutan	15,328
Cape Verde	14,150
Lesotho	14,092
Madagascar	14,085
Malawi	13,846
Saint Helena	13,349
Turkmenistan	12,695
Bermuda	12,334
Tonga	12,243
Timor-Leste	11,459
British Virgin Islands	10,948
Niue	8,940
Anguilla	8,482
Antigua and Barbuda	8,211
Algeria	7,802
Nepal	7,754
Belize	6,684
Benin	6,328
Togo	6,212
Mauritania	5,618
Saint Pierre and Miquelon	5,407
Congo	5,298
Palestine	4,936
Haiti	4,100
Saint Vincent and the Grenadines	3,938
Eritrea	3,878
Equatorial Guinea	2,444
Sudan	2,186
Bonaire	1,954
Marshall Islands	1,896
Guinea	1,895
Suriname	1,478
Saint Lucia	1,336
Libya	1,247
Yemen	1,144
Burundi	1,081
American Samoa	1,022
Central African Republic	840
Aruba	528
Sao Tome and Principe	466
Wallis and Futuna	435
Cuba	371
Guam	303
Samoa	83
Vanuatu	41
