= Firefighter =

Rescuer trained to extinguish fires and save people

- A firefighter team works together to contain a blazing barn

Occupation
- Synonyms: Fireman (PL: firemen); Firewoman (PL: firewomen)
- Activity sectors: Rescue, fire protection, civil service, public service, public safety

A firefighter (or fire fighter, fireman, or firewoman) is a first responder trained in public safety and emergency response such as firefighting, primarily to control and extinguish fires and respond to emergencies such as hazardous material incidents, medical emergencies, road traffic collisions and other emergencies that threaten life, property and the environment, as well as to rescue persons from confinement or dangerous situations and preserve evidence.

Firefighters may also provide ordinance regulations, safety requirements, and administrative public functions for the communities and areas they are subject to jurisdiction to. Male firefighters are sometimes referred to as firemen (and, less commonly, female firefighters as firewomen).

The fire department, also known in some countries as the fire brigade or fire service, is one of the three main emergency services. From urban areas to aboard ships, firefighters have become ubiquitous around the world.

The skills required for safe operations are regularly practiced during training evaluations throughout a firefighter's career. Initial firefighting skills are normally taught through local, regional or state-approved fire academies or training courses. Depending on the requirements of a department, additional skills and certifications may also be acquired at this time.

Firefighters work closely with other emergency response agencies such as the police and emergency medical service. A firefighter's role may overlap with both. Fire investigators or fire marshals investigate the cause of a fire. If the fire was caused by arson or negligence, their work will overlap with law enforcement. Firefighters may also provide some degree of emergency medical service (EMS).

== Duties ==
=== Fire suppression ===
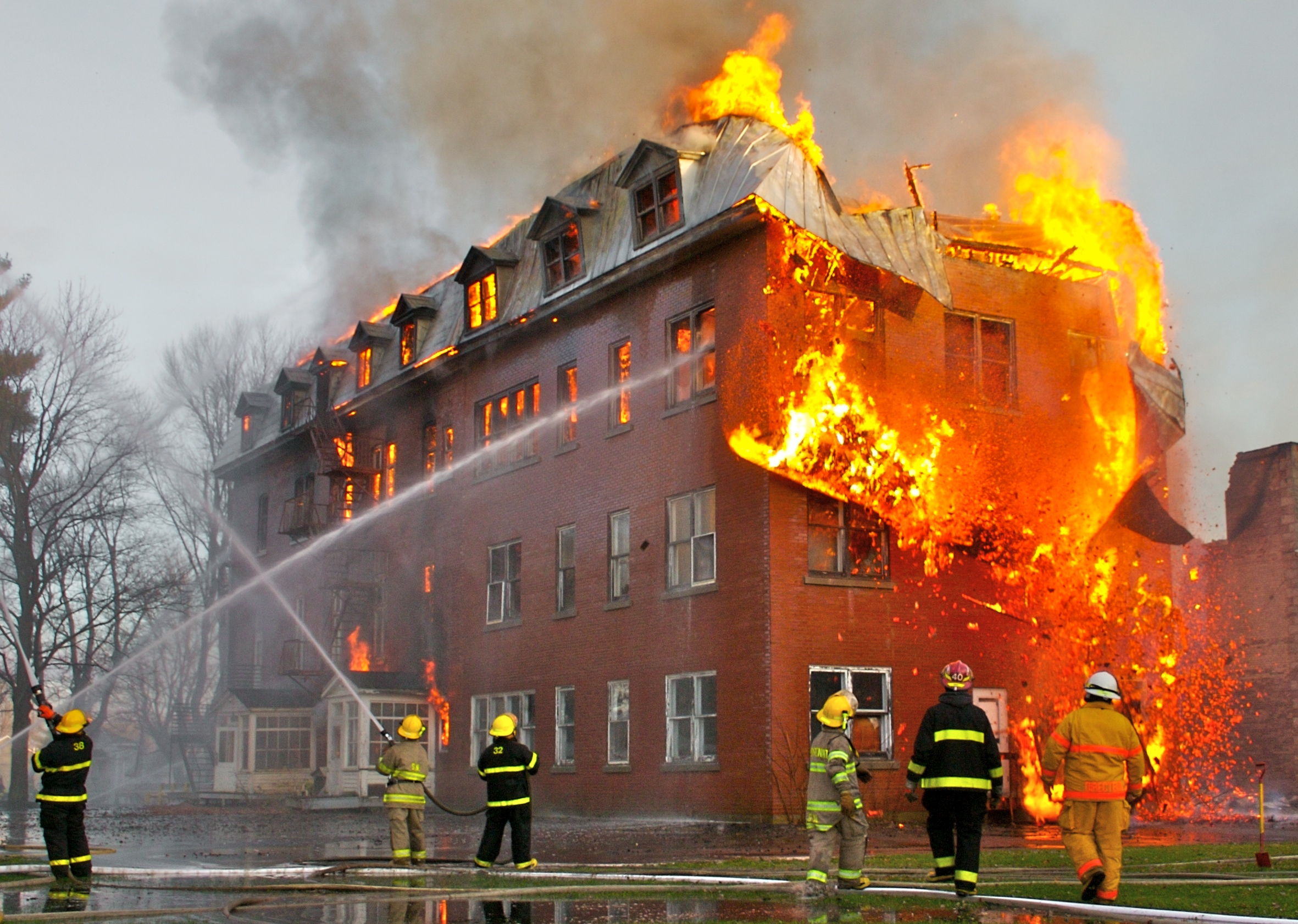
Firefighters had to focus their efforts on saving the adjacent church instead of this burning building, an abandoned convent in Massueville, Quebec, Canada

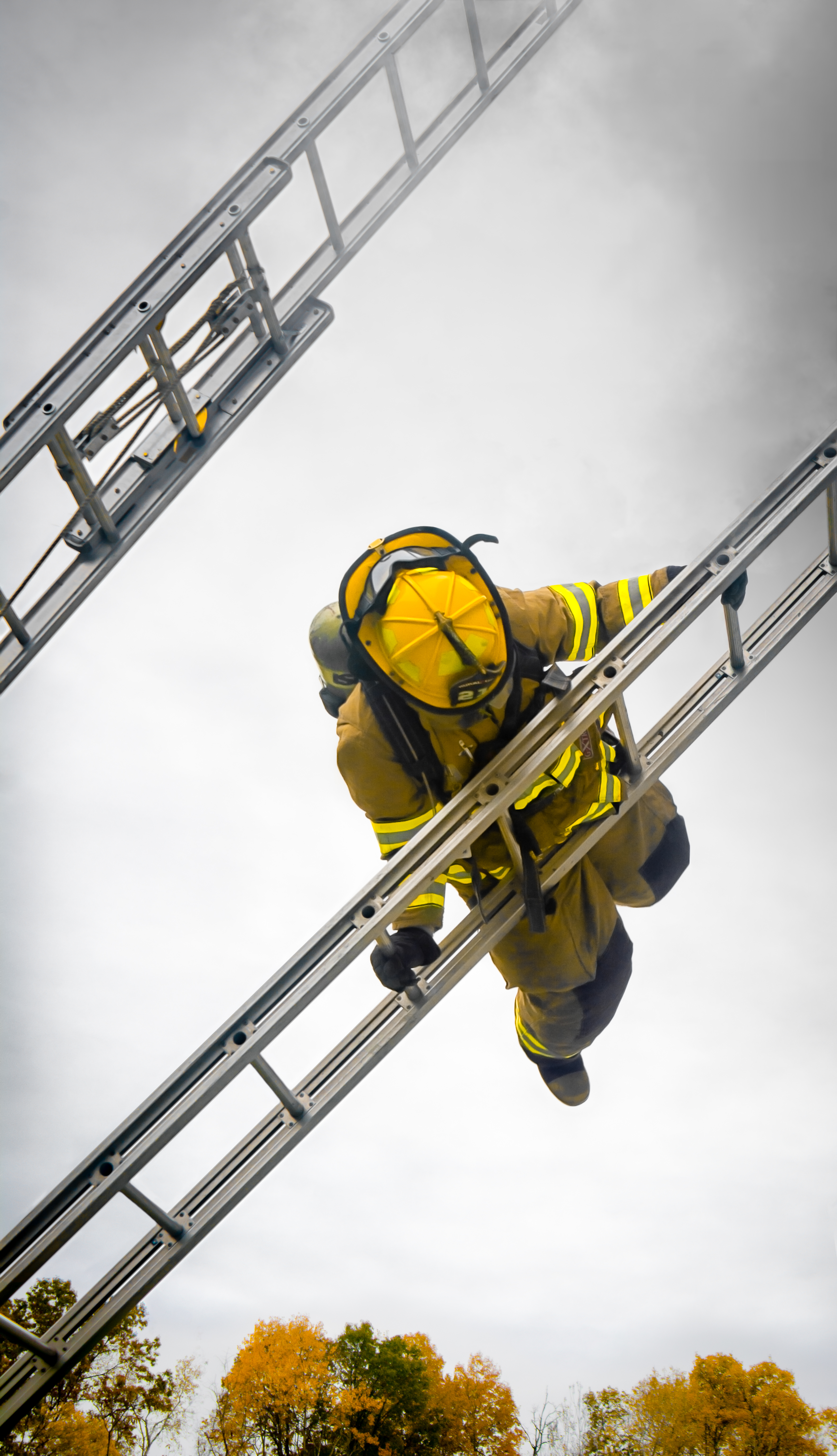
Firefighter carrying out a ladder slide

A fire burns due to the presence of three elements: fuel, oxygen and heat. This is often referred to as the fire triangle. Sometimes it is known as the fire tetrahedron if a fourth element is added: a chemical chain reaction which can help sustain certain types of fire. The aim of firefighting is to deprive the fire of at least one of those elements. Most commonly this is done by dousing the fire with water, though some fires require other methods such as foam or dry agents. Firefighters are equipped with a wide variety of equipment for this purpose that include ladder trucks, pumper trucks, tanker trucks, fire hose, and fire extinguishers.

See also Fire suppression for other techniques.

==== Structural firefighting ====
When fire departments respond to structure fires, the priorities are life safety, incident stabilization, and property conservation. When the first fire department arrives on-scene, crews assess the fire to determine the degree of risk and most appropriate response strategy, including offensive or defensive tactics from in or outside. Ultimately, the incident commander is responsible for determining strategy.

While structure fires can sometimes be limited to small areas of a structure, wider collateral damage due to smoke, water and burning embers is common. Crews may need to force entry to gain access into the structure. Utility shutoff (such as gas and electricity) is a priority for arriving fire crews. Some structures may require additional training and specialized firefighting tactics. For example, row house fires require specific tactics to decrease risks.

Buildings that are made of flammable materials such as wood are different from building materials such as concrete. Generally, a "fire-resistant" building is designed to limit fire to a small area or floor. Other floors can be safe by preventing smoke inhalation and damage. All buildings suspected to be or on fire must be evacuated, regardless of fire rating.

Structure fires may be fought from the interior and/or exterior. Interior crews may extend fire hose lines inside the building, find the fire and cool it with water. Exterior crews may direct water into windows and other openings, or at any surrounding fuel at risk of igniting.

===== Firefighting priorities and tactics =====
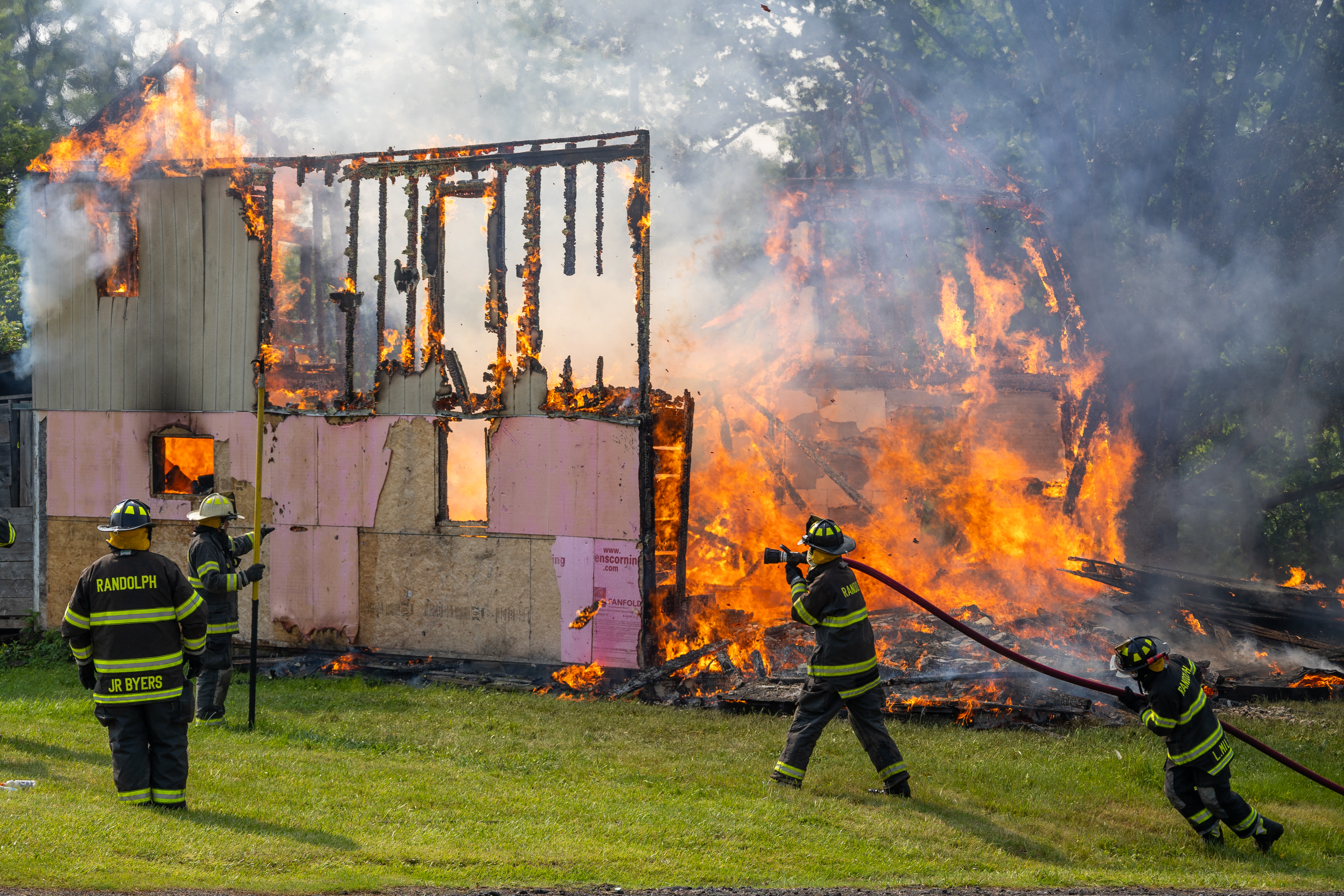
A team of volunteer firefighters practice skills on a controlled burn.

The incident commander should consider these priorities and firefighting tactics at a structure fire:

- Life safety – primary and secondary "All Clear(s)" (A/C)
- Property conservation – "Loss Stopped" (L/S)
- Post fire control firefighter decontamination (Decon)
- Customer Stabilization – Short term (Note: Customer stabilization refers to customer service that fire departments provide during an emergency. When a fire department responds to an emergency, two related priorities are life safety and stabilizing the incident. Part of this process is ensuring the customer's well-being from the time of dispatch until after the incident becomes stable.)

Some firefighting tactics may appear to be destructive, but often serve specific needs. For example, during ventilation, firefighters are forced to either open holes in the roof or floors of a structure (called vertical ventilation), or open windows and walls (called horizontal ventilation) to remove smoke and heated gases from the interior of the structure. Such ventilation methods are also used to improve interior visibility to locate victims more quickly. Ventilation helps to preserve the life of trapped or unconscious individuals as it releases the poisonous gases from inside the structure. Vertical ventilation is vital to firefighter safety in the event of a flashover or backdraft scenario. Releasing the flammable gases through the roof eliminates the possibility of a backdraft, and the removal of heat can reduce the possibility of a flashover. Flashovers, due to their intense heat (900–1,200 °F (480–650 °C)) and explosive temperaments, are commonly fatal to firefighter personnel. Precautionary methods, such as smashing a window, reveal backdraft situations before the firefighter enters the structure and is met with the circumstance head-on. Firefighter safety is the number one priority.

Whenever possible during a structure fire, property is moved into the middle of a room and covered with a salvage cover, a heavy cloth-like tarp. Various steps such as retrieving and protecting valuables found during suppression or overhaul, evacuating water, and boarding windows and roofs can divert or prevent post-fire runoff.

==== Wildland firefighting ====
Wildfires (known in Australia as bushfires) require a unique set of strategies and tactics. Wildfires have some ecological role in allowing new plants to grow, therefore in some cases they will be left to burn. Priorities in fighting wildfires include preventing the loss of life and property as well as ecological damage.

==== Aircraft rescue and firefighting ====
Airports employ specialist firefighters to deal with potential ground emergencies. Due to the mass casualty potential of an aviation emergency, the speed with which emergency response equipment and personnel arrive at the scene of the emergency is of paramount importance. When dealing with an emergency, the airport firefighters are tasked with rapidly securing the aircraft, its crew and its passengers from all hazards, particularly fire. Airport firefighters have advanced training in the application of firefighting foams, dry chemical and clean agents used to extinguish burning aviation fuel.

=== Rescue ===
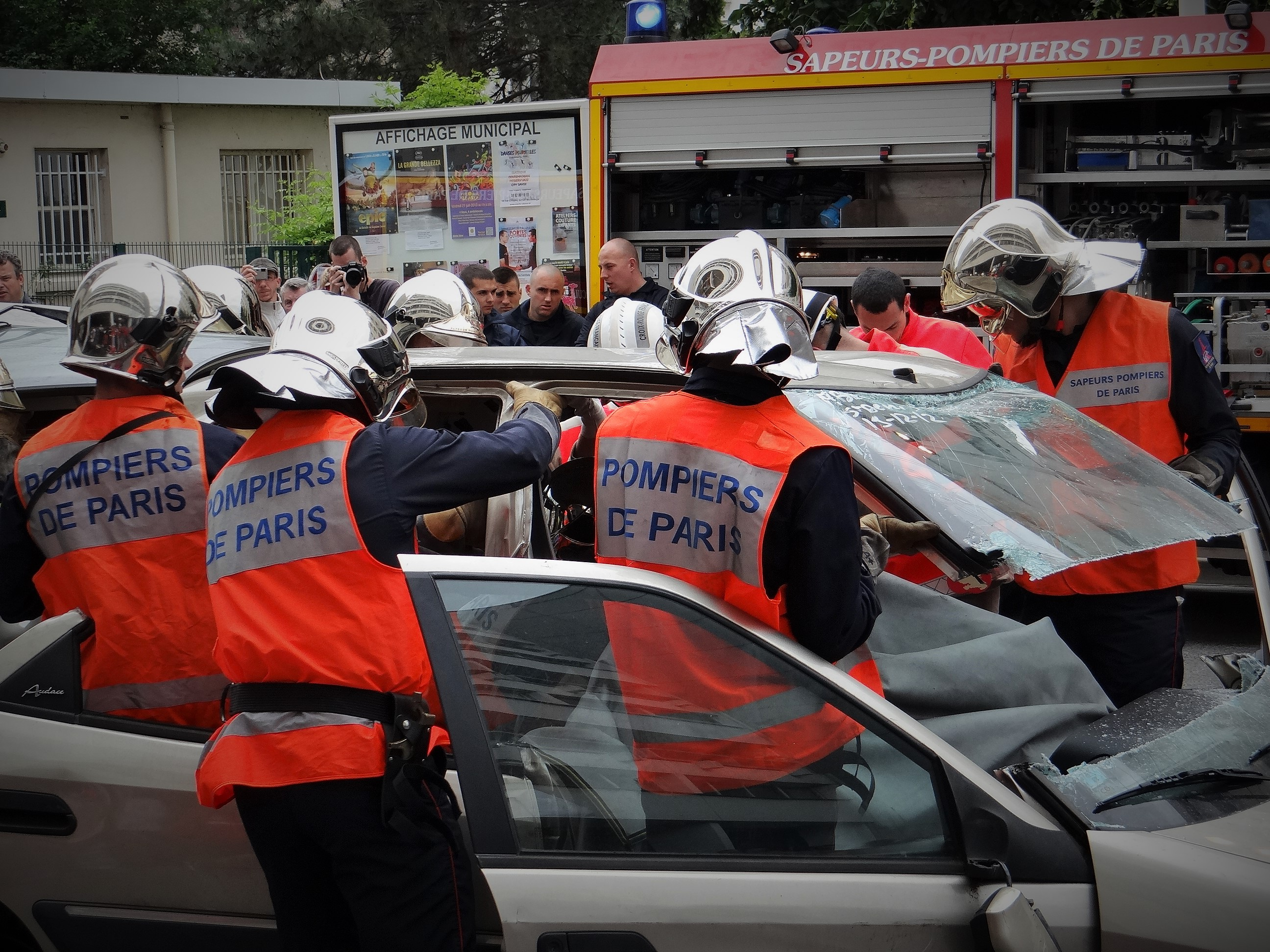
A demonstration of a vehicle extrication

Firefighters rescue persons from confinement or dangerous situations such as burning buildings and crashed vehicles. Complex, infrequent situations requiring specialized training and equipment include rescues from collapsed buildings and confined spaces. Many fire departments, including most in the United Kingdom, refer to themselves as a fire and rescue service for this reason. Large fire departments, such as the New York City Fire Department and London Fire Brigade, have specialist teams for advanced technical rescue. As structure fires have been in decline for many years in developed countries such as the United States, rescues other than fires make up an increasing proportion of their firefighters' work.

For vehicle extrication from crashed vehicles, firefighters commonly use powered hydraulic rescue tools—spreaders to pry open jammed body panels, cutters to cut through structural steel, and telescopic rams to lift and hold crushed roofs, together with a gasoline, electric or battery-powered hydraulic power unit. In North America these tools are evaluated under NFPA 1936, Standard on Rescue Tools, while in Europe powered rescue tools must meet EN 13204, Powered rescue tools for fire and rescue service use—Safety and performance requirements. For rescues from smoke-filled or confined spaces, crews often deploy a positive pressure ventilation (PPV) fan to clear heat and toxic smoke and improve visibility for entry teams.

=== Emergency medical services (EMS) ===
Firefighters frequently provide some degree of emergency medical care. In some jurisdictions first aid is the only medical training that firefighters have, and medical calls are the sole responsibility of a separate emergency medical services (EMS) agency. Elsewhere, it is common for firefighters to respond to medical calls. The impetus for this is the growing demand in medical emergencies and the significant decline in fires.

In such departments, firefighters are often certified as emergency medical technicians in order to deliver basic life support, and more rarely as paramedics to deliver advanced life support. In the United Kingdom, where fire services and EMS are run separately, fire service co-responding has been introduced more recently. Another point of variation is whether the firefighters respond in a fire engine or a response car.

=== Hazardous materials ===
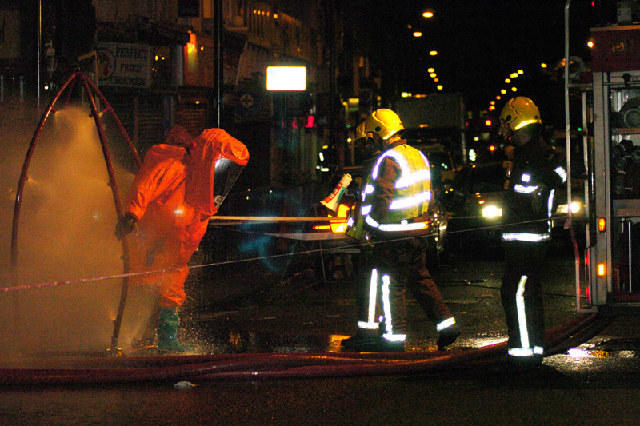
Decontamination after a chemical spill

Fire departments are usually the lead agency that responds to hazardous materials incidents. Specialized firefighters, known as hazardous materials technicians, are trained in chemical identification, leak and spill control, and decontamination. Specific procedures and equipment are needed to address fire at a property where hazardous materials are being used or stored.

=== Fire prevention ===
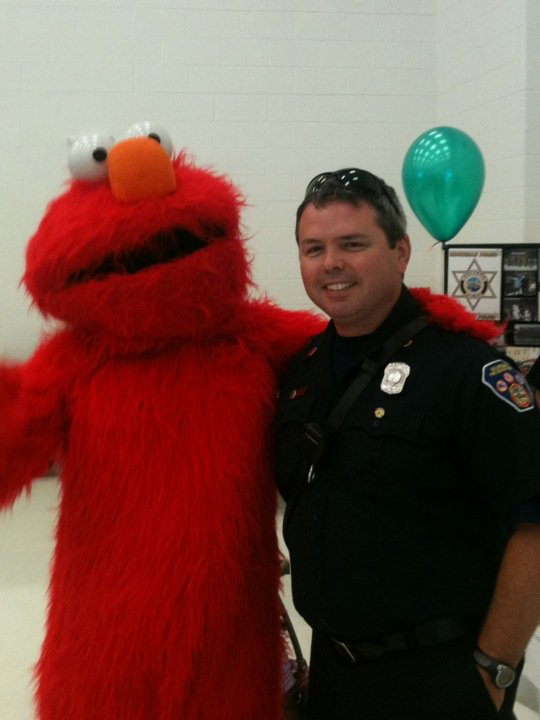
Firefighters frequently give fire prevention talks at schools and community events

Fire departments frequently provide advice to the public on how to prevent fires in the home and work-place environments. Fire inspectors or fire marshals will directly inspect businesses to ensure they are up to the current building fire codes, which are enforced so that a building can sufficiently resist fire spread, potential hazards are located, and to ensure that occupants can be safely evacuated, commensurate with the risks involved.

Fire suppression systems have a proven record for controlling and extinguishing unwanted fires. Many fire officials recommend that every building, including residences, have fire sprinkler systems. Correctly working sprinklers in a residence greatly reduce the risk of death from a fire. With the small rooms typical of a residence, one or two sprinklers can cover most rooms. In the United States, the housing industry trade groups have lobbied at the State level to prevent the requirement for fire sprinklers in one or two family homes.

Other methods of fire prevention are by directing efforts to reduce known hazardous conditions or by preventing dangerous acts before tragedy strikes. This is normally accomplished in many ways such as conducting presentations, distributing safety brochures, providing news articles, writing public safety announcements (PSA) or establishing displays in high traffic areas. Ensuring that each household has working smoke alarms, is educated in the proper techniques of fire safety, has an evacuation route and rendezvous point is of top priority in public education for most fire prevention teams in almost all fire department localities.

Fire investigators, who are experienced firefighters trained in fire cause determinism, are dispatched to fire scenes in order to investigate and determine whether the fire was a result of an accident or intentional. Some fire investigators have full law enforcement powers to investigate and arrest suspected arsonists.

== Occupational health and safety ==
=== Direct risks ===
==== Fires ====
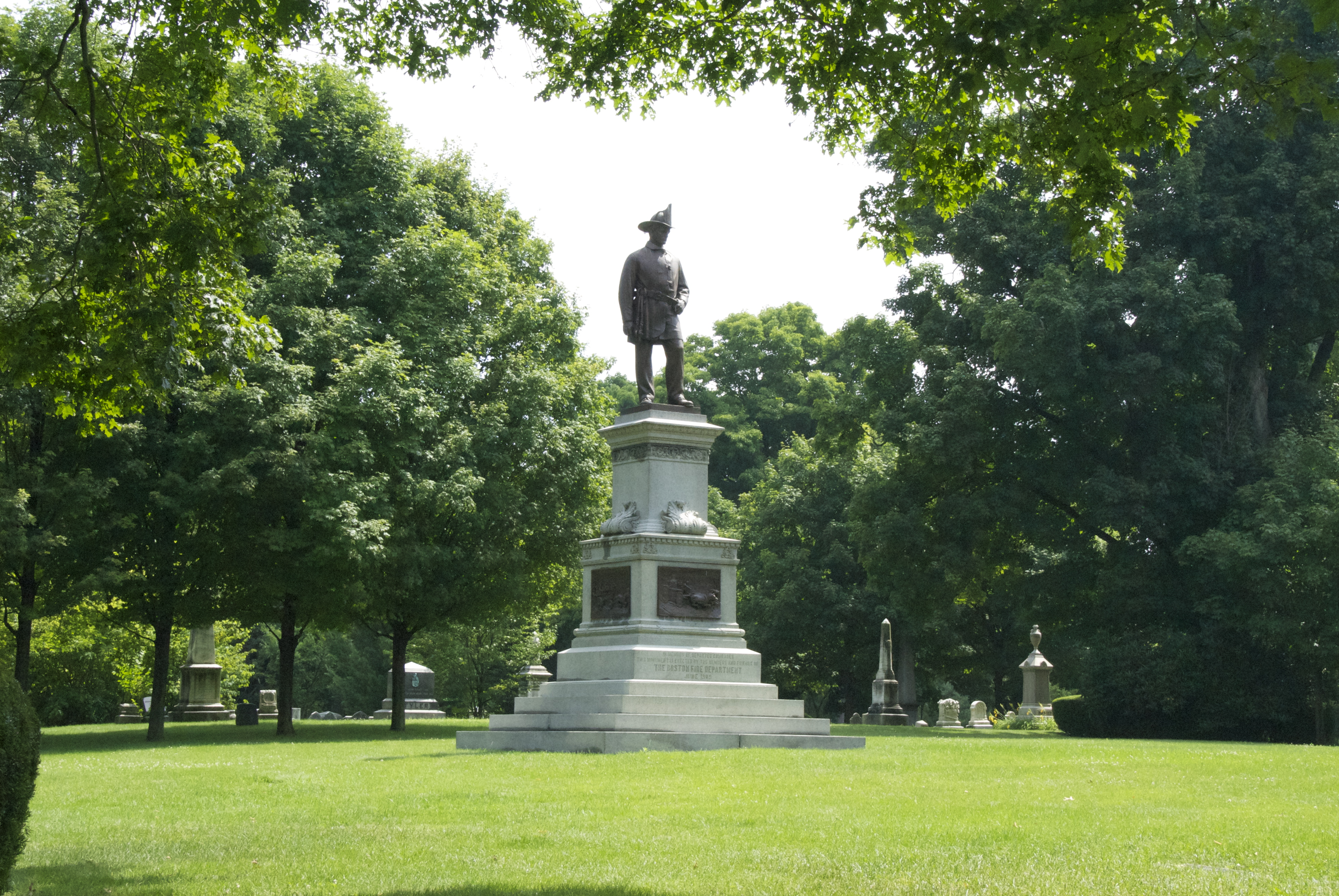
Firemen's Memorial (Boston) by John Wilson

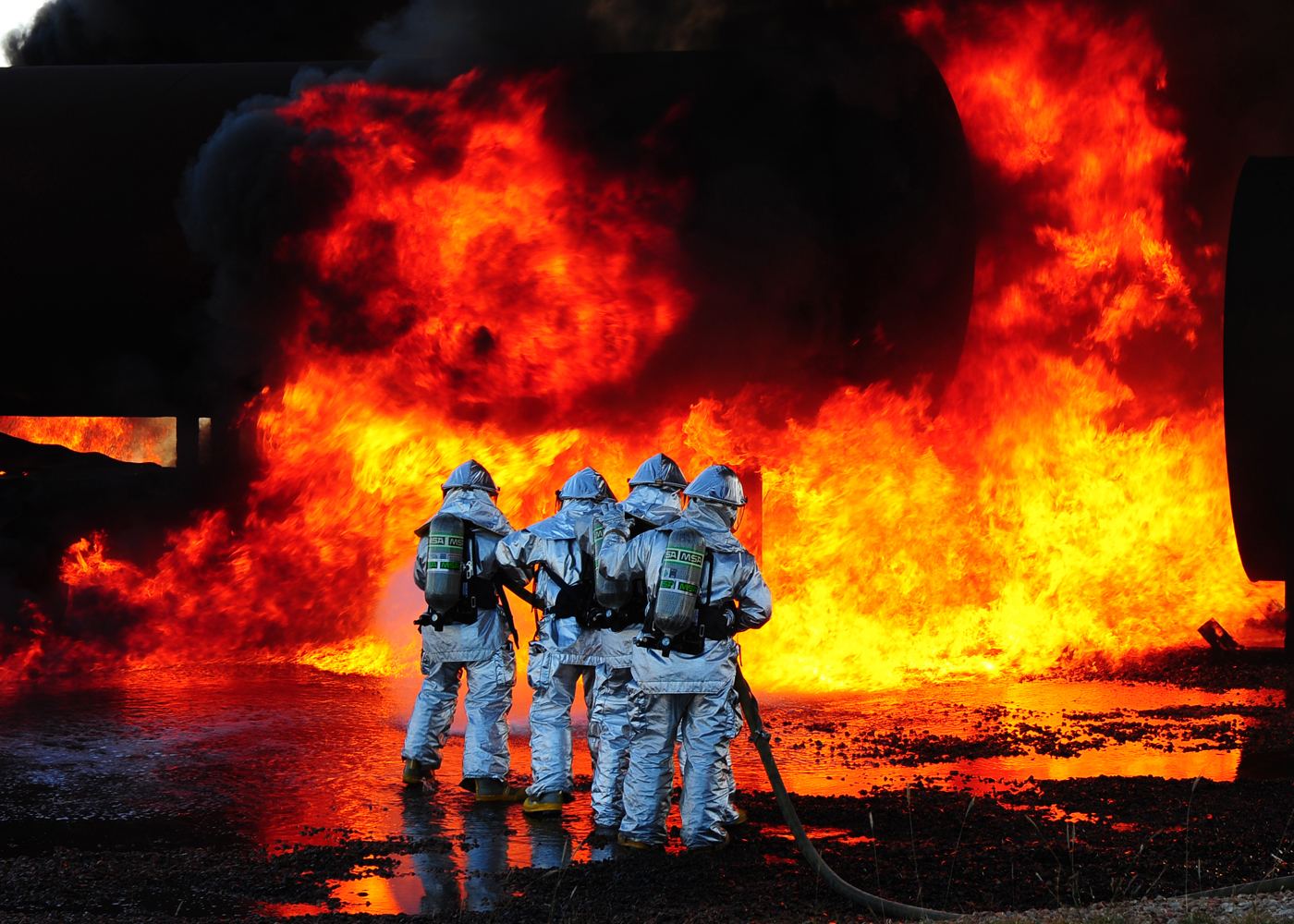
Firefighters wearing PPE tackle an aircraft fire during a drill at Dyess Air Force Base in Abilene, Texas

To allow protection from the inherent risks of fighting fires, firefighters wear and carry protective and self-rescue equipment at all times. A self-contained breathing apparatus (SCBA) delivers air to the firefighter through a full face mask and is worn to protect against smoke inhalation, toxic fumes, and super heated gases. A special device called a Personal Alert Safety System (PASS) is commonly worn independently or as a part of the SCBA to alert others when a firefighter stops moving for a specified period of time or manually operates the device. The PASS device sounds an alarm that can assist another firefighter (firefighter assist and search team (FAST), or rapid intervention team (RIT), in locating the firefighter in distress.

Firefighters often carry personal self-rescue ropes. The ropes are generally 30 feet (9.1 m) long and can provide a firefighter (that has enough time to deploy the rope) a partially controlled exit out of an elevated window. Lack of a personal rescue rope is cited in the deaths of two New York City firefighters, Lt. John Bellew and Lt. Curtis Meyran, who died after they jumped from the fourth floor of a burning apartment building in the Bronx. Of the four firefighters who jumped and survived, only one of them had a self-rescue rope. Since the incident, the Fire Department of New York City has issued self-rescue ropes to their firefighters.

Heat injury is a major issue for firefighters as they wear insulated clothing and cannot shed the heat generated from physical exertion. Early detection of heat issues is critical to stop dehydration and heat stress becoming fatal. Early onset of heat stress affects cognitive function which combined with operating in dangerous environment makes heat stress and dehydration a critical issue to monitor. Firefighter physiological status monitoring is showing promise in alerting EMS and commanders to the status of their people on the fire ground. Devices such as PASS device alert 10–20 seconds after a firefighter has stopped moving in a structure. Physiological status monitors measure a firefighter's vital sign status, fatigue and exertion levels and transmit this information over their voice radio. This technology allows a degree of early warning to physiological stress. These devices are similar to technology developed for Future Force Warrior and give a measure of exertion and fatigue. They also tell the people outside a building when they have stopped moving or fallen. This allows a supervisor to call in additional engines before the crew get exhausted and also gives an early warning to firefighters before they run out of air, as they may not be able to make voice calls over their radio. Current OSHA tables exist for heat injury and the allowable amount of work in a given environment based on temperature, humidity and solar loading.

Firefighters are also at risk for developing rhabdomyolysis. Rhabdomyolysis is the breakdown of muscle tissue and has many causes including heat exposure, high core body temperature, and prolonged, intense exertion. Routine firefighter tasks, such as carrying extra weight of equipment and working in hot environments, can increase firefighters' risk for rhabdomyolysis.

==== Structural collapses ====
Another leading cause of death during firefighting is structural collapse of a burning building (e.g. a wall, floor, ceiling, roof, or truss system). Structural collapse, which often occurs without warning, may crush or trap firefighters inside the structure. To avoid loss of life, all on-duty firefighters should maintain two-way communication with the incident commander and be equipped with a personal alert safety system device (PASS) on all fire scenes and maintain radio communication on all incidents. Francis Brannigan was the founder and greatest contributor to this element of firefighter safety.

To allow rescuers to operate safely beneath or beside partially collapsed structures, teams erect temporary shoring—heavy-duty, adjustable aluminum or hydraulic shores, vertical posts and raker shores—that transfer dead and live loads from unstable walls, floors and ceilings onto stable ground. The built-in-place shoring designs used by U.S. Federal Emergency Management Agency Urban Search and Rescue task forces are documented in the Department of Homeland Security field guide on building stabilization and shoring techniques. The advantage of purpose-built, modular shoring kits over traditional timber props is faster erection, a predictable rated load, and repeatable adjustment as loads shift during operation; they create a protected working zone through which rescuers can enter voids to search for and remove trapped victims while reducing the risk of secondary collapse. Structural collapse rescue operations and training fall under NFPA 1670, Standard on Operations and Training for Technical Search and Rescue Incidents (now consolidated into NFPA 2500).

==== Traffic collisions ====
In the United States, 25% of fatalities of firefighters are caused by traffic collisions while responding to or returning from an incident. Other firefighters have been injured or killed by vehicles at the scene of a fire or emergency (Paulison 2005). A common measure fire departments have taken to prevent this is to require firefighters to wear a bright yellow reflective vest over their turnout coats if they have to work on a public road, to make them more visible to passing drivers.

==== Violence ====
Firefighters have occasionally been assaulted by members of the public while responding to calls. These kinds of attacks can cause firefighters to fear for their safety when responding to specific areas and may cause them to not have full focus on the situation which could result in injury to their selves or the patient. Workplace violence consists of the mental and physical abuse sustained during on-duty activities. First Responders are the most likely to experience this type of violence and EMS even has a percentage range of 53-90% of calls that had an instance of Workplace violence. This type of violence is a major reason for burnout and depression in First Responders, while EMS deal more with people on a daily basis, ~18% Firefighters experience PTSD due to WPV and 60% had at least one call where they had feared for their life or questioned their safety.

==== Chemical exposure ====
While firefighters are generally responsible for managing hazardous materials in the environment, there is a great deal of risks that they face by doing so. Flame retardants are chemical products that are utilized to slow down or stop the spread of a fire by reducing its intensity. While there are numerous benefits to flame retardant products in terms of the reduction of major fires, the components that make up these substances are extremely harmful.

The most concerning materials that make up these products are PFAS chemicals. Studies linked PFAS exposure with health effects including major neurological defects and cancer. Long term exposure to these chemicals is a notable concern.

While many hazardous chemicals used in fire-fighting materials, such as penta-bromdiphenyl ether have already been banned by the government, they are almost immediately replaced by a new substance with similar harmful effects. After banning penta-bromodiphenyl ether, chlorinated tris, chloroalkyl phosphates, halogenated aryl esters, and tetrabromophthalate dio diester were used instead. While these chemicals are constantly changing with attempts to make it safer for the public, firefighters have constant, up-close exposure that can put them at increased risk.

=== During debris cleanup ===
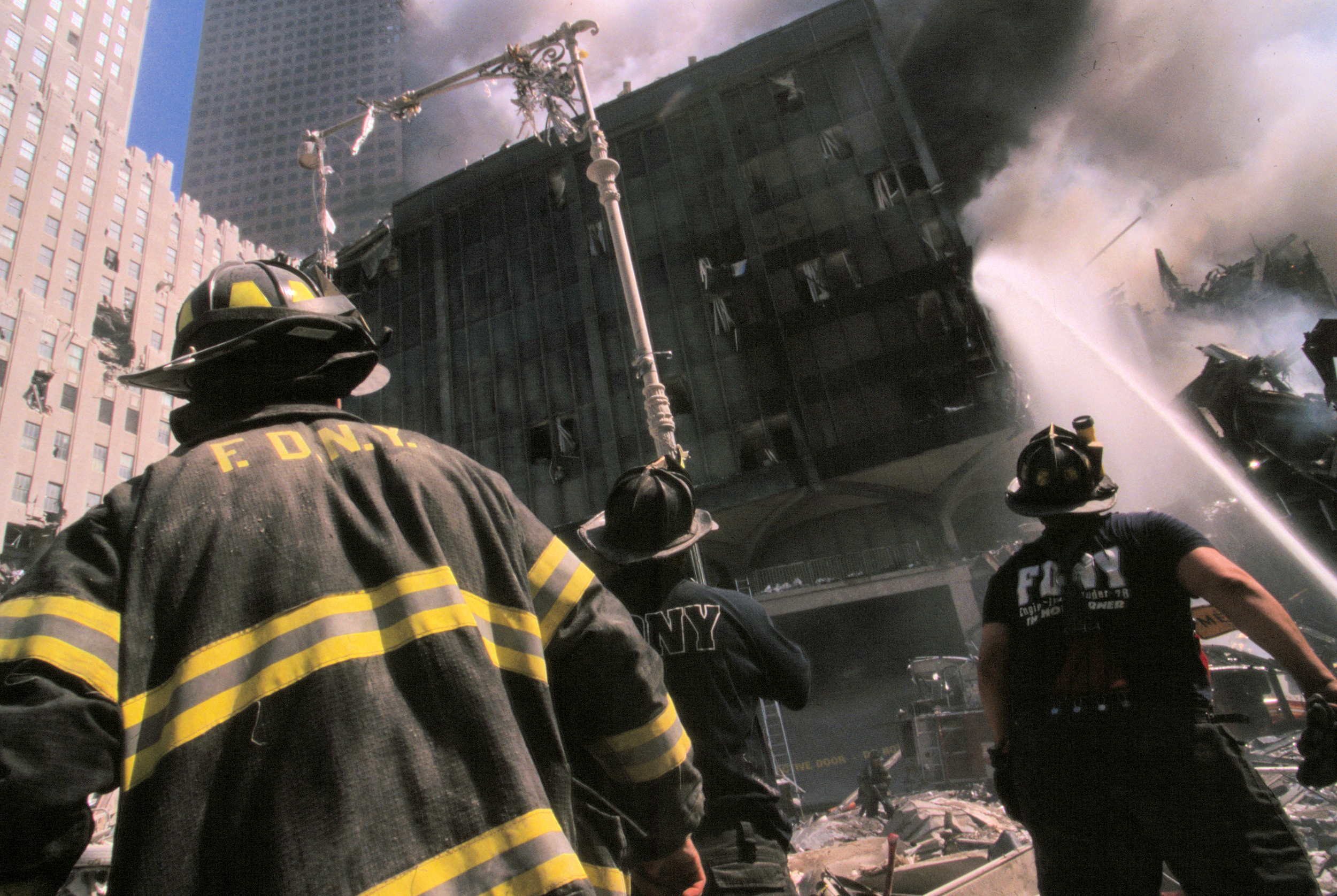
Firefighters at Ground Zero during the September 11 attacks

Once extinguished, fire debris cleanup poses several safety and health risks for workers.

Many hazardous substances are commonly found in fire debris. Silica can be found in concrete, roofing tiles, or it may be a naturally occurring element. Occupational exposures to silica dust can cause silicosis, lung cancer, pulmonary tuberculosis, airway diseases, and some additional non-respiratory diseases. Inhalation of asbestos can result in various diseases including asbestosis, lung cancer, and mesothelioma. Sources of metals exposure include burnt or melted electronics, cars, refrigerators, stoves, etc. Fire debris cleanup workers may be exposed to these metals or their combustion products in the air or on their skin. These metals may include beryllium, cadmium, chromium, cobalt, lead, manganese, nickel, and many more. Polyaromatic hydrocarbons (PAHs), some of which are carcinogenic, come from the incomplete combustion of organic materials and are often found as a result of structural and wildland fires.

Safety hazards of fire cleanup include the risk of reignition of smoldering debris, electrocution from downed or exposed electrical lines or in instances where water has come into contact with electrical equipment. Structures that have been burned may be unstable and at risk of sudden collapse.

Standard personal protective equipment for fire cleanup include hard hats, goggles or safety glasses, heavy work gloves, earplugs or other hearing protection, steel-toe boots, and fall protection devices. Hazard controls for electrical injury include assuming all power lines are energized until confirmation they are de-energized, and grounding power lines to guard against electrical feedback, and using appropriate personal protective equipment. Proper respiratory protection can protect against hazardous substances. Proper ventilation of an area is an engineering control that can be used to avoid or minimize exposure to hazardous substances. When ventilation is insufficient or dust cannot be avoided, personal protective equipment such as N95 respirators can be used.

=== Long-term risks ===
==== Cardiovascular disease ====
Firefighting has long been associated with poor cardiovascular outcomes. In the United States, the most common cause of on-duty fatalities for firefighters is sudden cardiac death, accounting for approximately 45% of on duty US firefighter deaths. In addition to personal factors that may predispose an individual to coronary artery disease or other cardiovascular diseases, occupational exposures can significantly increase a firefighter's risk. Historically, the fire service blamed poor firefighter physical condition for being the primary cause of cardiovascular related deaths. However, over the last 20 years, studies and research has indicated the toxic gasses put fire service personnel at significantly higher risk for cardiovascular related conditions and death. For instance, carbon monoxide, present in nearly all fire environments, and hydrogen cyanide, formed during the combustion of paper, cotton, plastics, and other substances containing carbon and nitrogen. The substances inside of materials change during combustion, and their by-products can interfere with the transport of oxygen in the body. Hypoxia can then lead to heart injury. In addition, chronic exposure to particulate matter in smoke is associated with atherosclerosis. Noise exposures may contribute to hypertension and possibly ischemic heart disease. Other factors associated with firefighting, such as stress, heat stress, and heavy physical exertion, also increase the risk of cardiovascular events.

During fire suppression activities a firefighter can reach peak or near peak heart rates which can act as a trigger for a cardiac event. For example, tachycardia can cause plaque buildup to break loose and lodge itself inside heart or blood vessels causing myocardial infarction, also known as a heart attack. This along with unhealthy habits and lack of exercise can be very hazardous to firefighter health.

==== Cancer ====
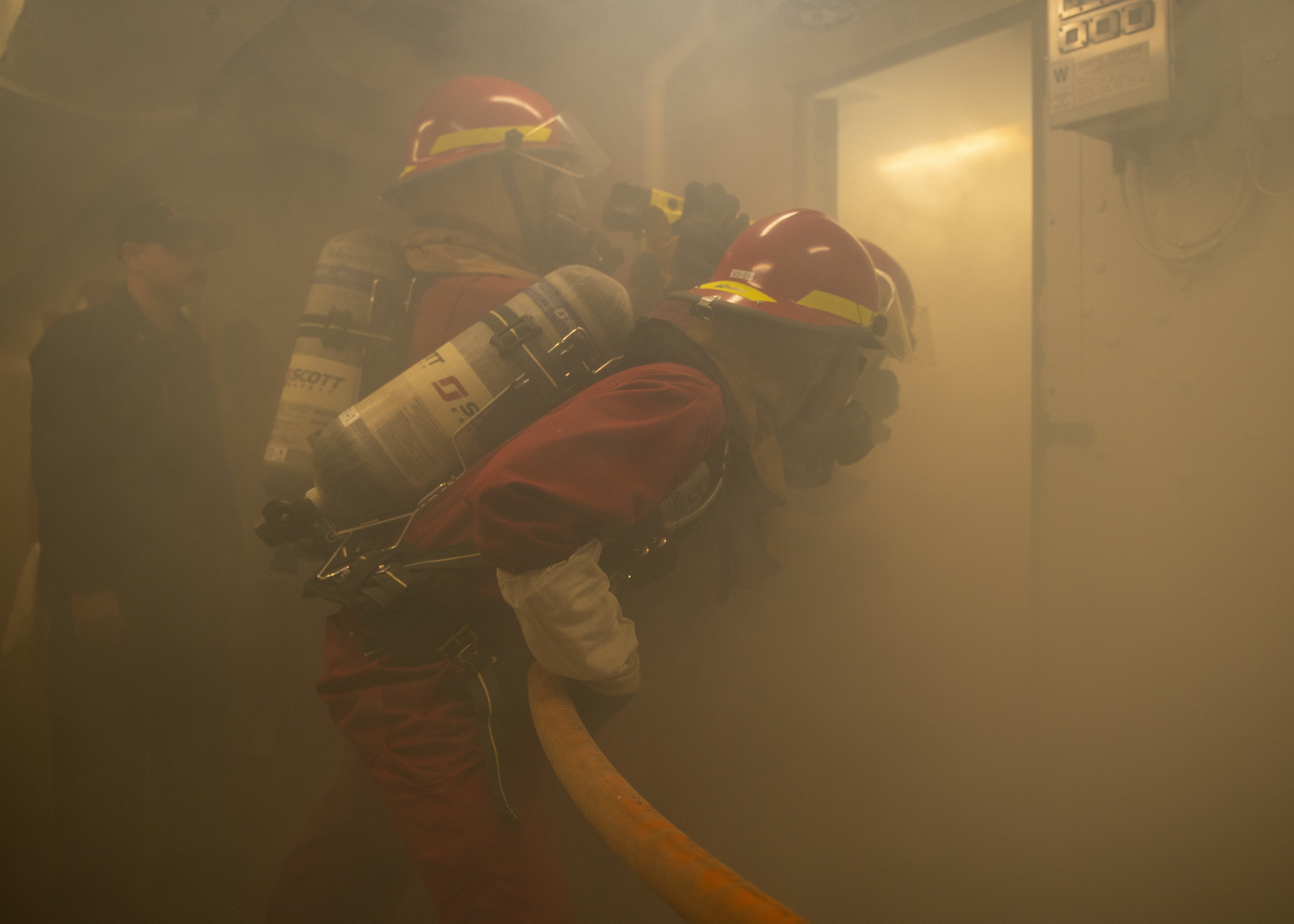
Smoke can expose firefighters to a variety of carcinogens

Cancer risk in the U.S. fire service is a topic of growing concern. Recent studies suggest that due to their exposure on the fireground, firefighters may be at an increased risk for certain types of cancer and other chronic diseases. Additionally, large international studies generally support the finding from U.S. studies that firefighters have elevated rates of cancer, with some variation by cancer site.

A 2015 retrospective longitudinal study showed that firefighters are at higher risk for certain types of cancer. Firefighters had mesothelioma, which is caused by asbestos exposure, at twice the rate of the non-firefighting working population. Younger firefighters (under age 65) also developed bladder cancer and prostate cancer at higher rates than the general population. The risk of bladder cancer may be present in female firefighters, but research is inconclusive as of 2014. Preliminary research from 2015 on a large cohort of US firefighters showed a direct relationship between the number of hours spent fighting fires and lung cancer and leukemia mortality in firefighters. This link is a topic of continuing research in the medical community, as is cancer mortality in general among firefighters.

In addition to epidemiological studies, mechanistic studies have used biomarkers to investigate exposures' effects on biological changes that could be related to cancer development. Several of these studies have found evidence of DNA damage, oxidative stress, and epigenetic changes related to firefighters' exposures.

Firefighters regularly encounter carcinogenic materials and hazardous contaminants, which is thought to contribute to their excess cancer risk. Dozens of chemicals classified by the International Agency for Research on Cancer (IARC) as known or probable carcinogens have been identified on the fireground. Several studies have documented airborne and/or dermal exposures to carcinogenic compounds during firefighting, as well as contamination on turnout gear and other equipment worn by firefighters. Some of these compounds have been shown to absorb into firefighters' bodies.

In addition to chemical exposures, firefighters often work 24-hr shifts or longer, and may respond to emergencies at night. Night shift work has been classified as a probable human carcinogen by IARC. Some firefighters also work with hazardous materials and trained to control and clean up these dangerous materials, such as oil spills and chemical accidents. As firefighters combat a fire and clean up hazardous materials, there is a risk of harmful chemicals coming in contact with their skin if it penetrates their personal protective equipment (PPE). In June 2022, IARC classified occupational exposure as a firefighter as "carcinogenic to humans."

Firefighters can also be exposed to radiation (alpha radiation, beta radiation, and gamma radiation).

There are many types of firefighters. Most research on firefighters' cancer risk has involved structural or municipal career firefighters. Wildland firefighters are specially trained firefighters tasked with controlling forest fires. They frequently create fire lines, which are swathes of cut-down trees and dug-up grass placed in the path of the fire. This is designed to deprive the fire of fuel. Wildland firefighting is a physically demanding job with many acute hazards. Wildland firefighters may hike several miles while carrying heavy equipment during the wildfire season, which has increased in duration over time, especially in the western United States. Unlike structural firefighters, wildland firefighters typically do not wear respiratory protection, and may inhale particulate and other compounds emitted by the wildfires. They also use prescribed fires to burn potential fire fuel under controlled conditions. To examine cancer risk for wildland firefighters, a risk assessment was conducted using an exposure-response relationship for risk of lung cancer mortality and measured particulate matter exposure from smoke at wildfires. This study concluded that wildland firefighters could have an increased risk of lung cancer mortality. The research on cancer for other subspecialty groups of firefighters is limited, but a recent study of fire instructors in Australia found an exposure-response relationship between training exposures and cancer incidence.

Due to the lack of central and comprehensive sources of data, research on cancer rates amongst firefighters has been challenging. On July 7, 2018, Congress passed the Firefighter Cancer Registry Act of 2018 requiring the Centers for Disease Control and Prevention to create the National Firefighter Registry designed to collect data on cancer rates among U.S. firefighters.

==== Mental stress ====
As with other emergency workers, firefighters may witness traumatic scenes during their careers. They are thus more vulnerable than most people to certain mental health issues such as post-traumatic stress disorder and suicidal thoughts and behaviors. Among women in the US, the occupations with the highest suicide rates are police and firefighters, with a rate of 14.1 per 100,000, according to the National Center for Injury Prevention and Control, CDC. Chronic stress over time attributes to symptoms that affect first responders, such as anxiousness, irritability, nervousness, memory and concentration problems can occur overtime which can lead to anxiety and depression. Mental stress can have long lasting affects on the brain. A 2014 report from the National Fallen Firefighters Foundation found that a fire department is three times more likely to experience a suicide in a given year than a line-of-duty death. Mental stress of the job can lead to substance abuse and alcohol abuse as ways of coping with the stress. The mental stress of fire fighting has many different causes. There are those they see on duty and also what they miss by being on duty. Firefighters schedules fluctuate by district. There are stations where fire fighters work 48 hours on and 48 hours off, whereas some allow 24 hours on and 72 hours off. The mental impact of missing a child's first steps or a ballet recital can take a heavy impact on first responders. There is also the stress of being on opposite shifts as a spouse or being away from family.

When not on the scene of an emergency, firefighters remain on call at fire stations, where they eat, sleep, and perform other duties during their shifts. Hence, sleep disruption is another occupational hazard that they may encounter at their job. Some other hazards that firefighters can face on the job that can lead to mental stress is having no time for home life, unpredictable work, and even inadequate support systems.

==== Occupational hearing loss ====
Another long-term risk factor from firefighting is exposure to high levels of sound, which can cause noise-induced hearing loss (NIHL) and tinnitus. NIHL affects sound frequencies between 3,000 and 6,000 Hertz first, then with more frequent exposure, will spread to more frequencies. Many consonants will be more difficult to hear or inaudible with NIHL because of the higher frequencies effected, which results in poorer communication. NIHL is caused by exposure to sound levels at or above 85dBA according to NIOSH and at or above 90dBA according to OSHA. dBA represents A-weighted decibels. dBA is used for measuring sound levels relating to occupational sound exposure since it attempts to mimic the sensitivity of the human ear to different frequencies of sound. OSHA uses a 5-dBA exchange rate, which means that for every 5dBA increase in sound from 90dBA, the acceptable exposure time before a risk of permanent hearing loss occurs decreases by half (starting with 8 hours acceptable exposure time at 90dBA). NIOSH uses a 3-dBA exchange rate starting at 8 hours acceptable exposure time at 85dBA.

The time of exposure required to potentially cause damage depends on the level of sound exposed to. The most common causes of excessive sound exposure are sirens, transportation to and from fires, fire alarms, and work tools. Traveling in an emergency vehicle has shown to expose a person to between 103 and 114dBA of sound. According to OSHA, exposure at this level is acceptable for between 17 and 78 minutes and according to NIOSH is acceptable for between 35 seconds and 7.5 minutes over a 24-hour day before permanent hearing loss can occur. This time period considers that no other high level sound exposure occurs in that 24-hour time frame. Sirens often output about 120 dBA, which according to OSHA, 7.5 minutes of exposure is needed and according to NIOSH, 9 seconds of exposure is needed in a 24-hour time period before permanent hearing loss can occur. In addition to high sound levels, another risk factor for hearing disorders is the co-exposure to chemicals that are ototoxic.

The average day of work for a firefighter can often be under the sound exposure limit for both OSHA and NIOSH. While the average day of sound exposure as a firefighter is often under the limit, firefighters can be exposed to impulse noise, which has a very low acceptable time exposure before permanent hearing damage can occur due to the high intensity and short duration.

There are also high rates of hearing loss, often NIHL, in firefighters, which increases with age and number of years working as a firefighter. Hearing loss prevention programs have been implemented in multiple stations and have shown to help lower the rate of firefighters with NIHL. Other attempts have been made to lower sound exposures for firefighters, such as enclosing the cabs of the firetrucks to lower the siren exposure while driving. NFPA (National Fire Protection Association) is responsible for occupational health programs and standards in firefighters which discusses what hearing sensitivity is required to work as a firefighter, but also enforces baseline (initial) and annual hearing tests (based on OSHA hearing maintenance regulations). While NIHL can be a risk that occurs from working as a firefighter, NIHL can also be a safety concern for communicating while doing the job as communicating with coworkers and victims is essential for safety. Hearing protection devices have been used by firefighters in the United States. Earmuffs are the most commonly used hearing protection device (HPD) as they are the most easy to put on correctly in a quick manner. Multiple fire departments have used HPDs that have communication devices built in, allowing firefighters to speak with each other at safe, but audible sound levels, while lowering the hazardous sound levels around them.

== Types of coverage and workload ==
In a country with a comprehensive fire service, fire departments must be able to send firefighters to emergencies at any hour of day or night, to arrive on the scene within minutes. In urban areas, this means that full-time paid firefighters usually have shift work, with some providing cover each night. On the other hand, it may not be practical to employ full-time firefighters in villages and isolated small towns, where their services may not be required for days at a time. For this reason, many fire departments have firefighters who spend long periods on call to respond to infrequent emergencies; they may have regular jobs outside of firefighting.

Whether they are paid or not varies by country. In the United States and Germany, volunteer fire departments provide most of the cover in rural areas. In the United Kingdom and Ireland, by contrast, actual volunteers are rare. Instead, "retained firefighters" are paid for responding to incidents, along with a small salary for spending long periods of time on call. The combined fire services of the United Kingdom retain around 18,000 retained firefighters alongside their wholetime colleagues. In both the UK and Ireland retained firefighters make up the majority of active firefighting personnel. Their training, qualifications, and range of possible deployments, are all comparable to wholetime firefighters. Retained firefighters are required to live or work within a set radius of their assigned fire station - in the United Kingdom this is usually 1 mile (1.6 km), and in Ireland 2 miles (3.2 km).

== Firefighting around the world ==
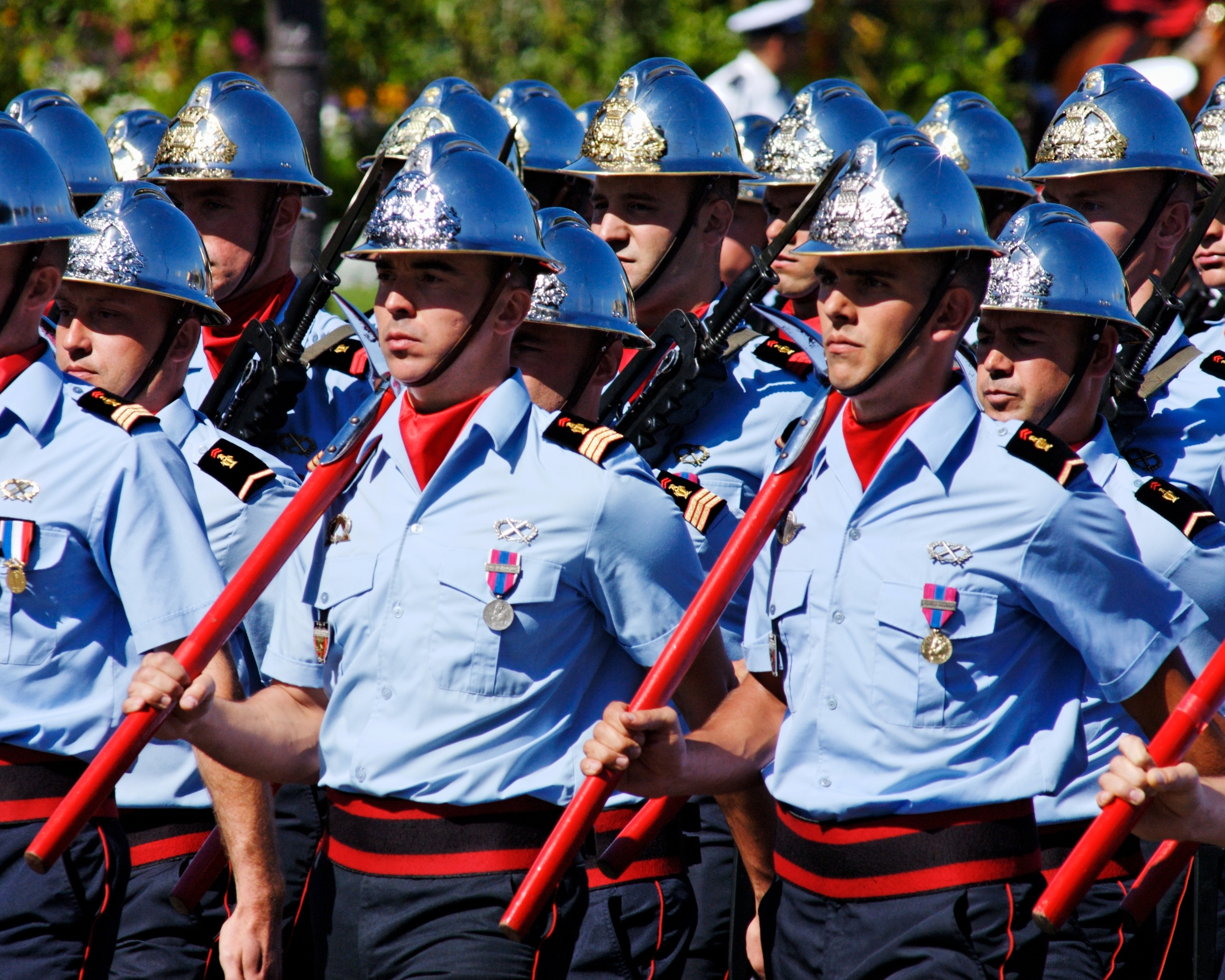
The Paris Fire Brigade is a French Army unit which serves as the fire service for Paris and certain sites of national strategic importance.

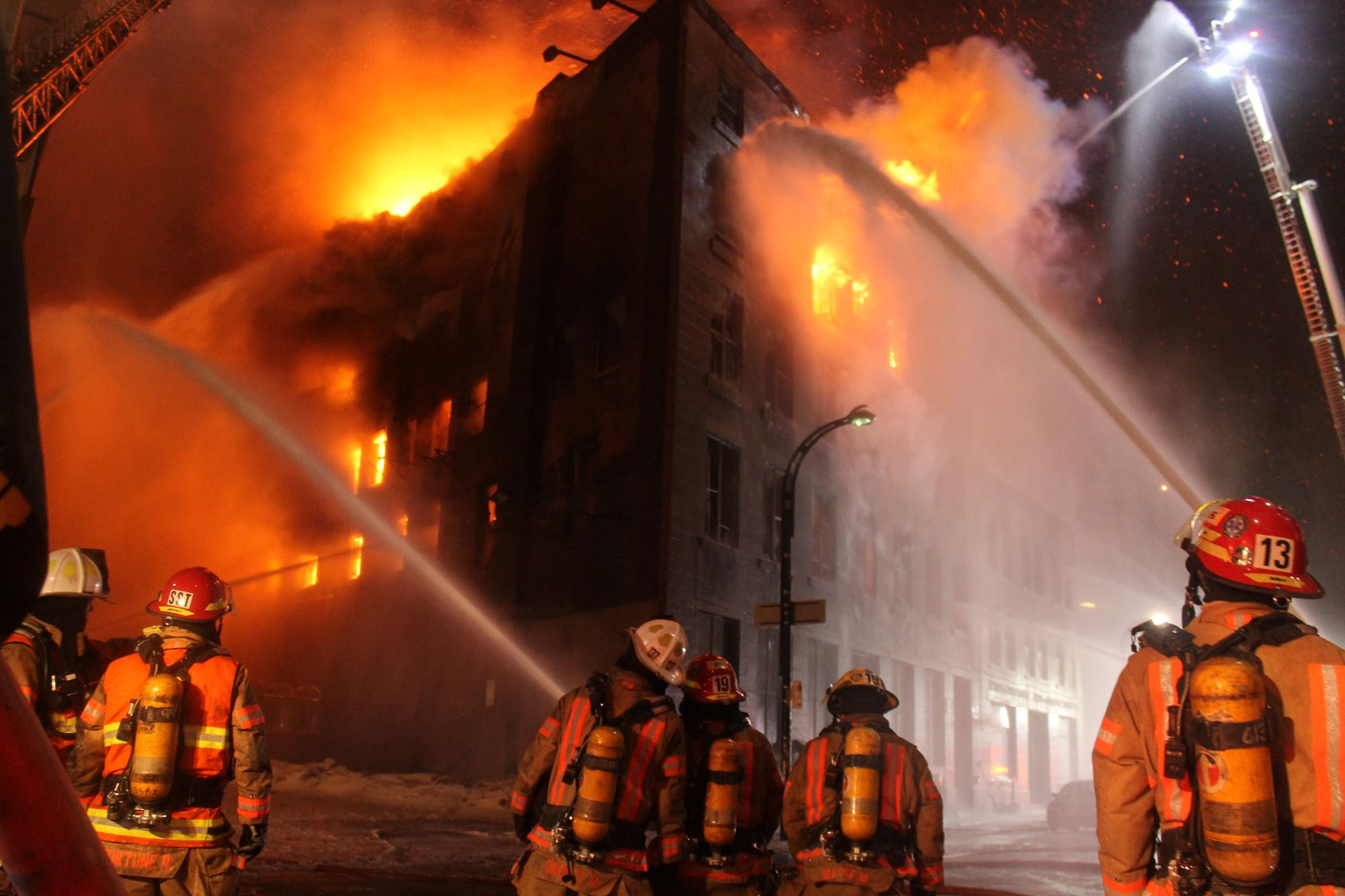
Firefighters tackling a blaze in Montreal, Canada

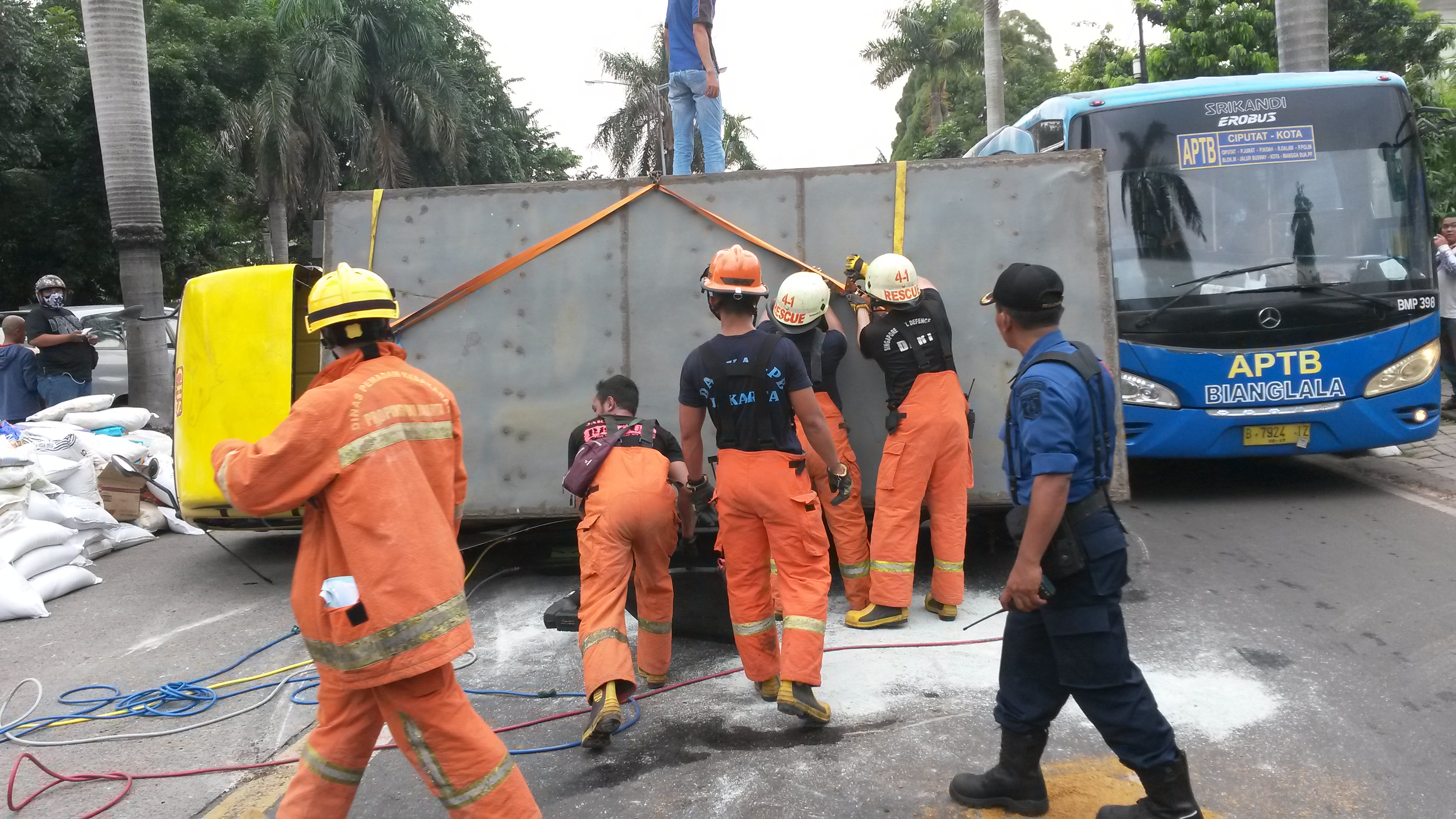
Indonesian fire fighters handling a traffic accident in Jakarta

A key difference between many countries' fire services is what the balance is between full-time and volunteer (or on-call) firefighters. In the United States and United Kingdom, large metropolitan fire departments are almost entirely made up of full-time firefighters. On the other hand, in Germany and Austria, volunteers play a substantial role even in the largest fire departments, including Berlin's, which serves a population of 3.6 million. Regardless of how this balance works, a common feature is that smaller urban areas have a mix of full-time and volunteer/on-call firefighters. This is known in the United States as a combination fire department. In Chile and Peru, all firefighters are volunteers.

Another point of variation is how the fire services are organized. Some countries like the Czech Republic, Israel and New Zealand have a single national fire service. Others like Australia, the United Kingdom and France organize fire services based on regions or sub-national states. In the United States, Austria, Germany and Canada, fire departments are run at a municipal level.

Singapore and many parts of Switzerland have fire service conscription. In Germany, conscription can also be used if a village does not have a functioning fire service. Other unusual arrangements are seen in Denmark, where most fire services are run by private companies, and in France, where two of the country's fire services (the Paris Fire Brigade and the Marseille Naval Fire Battalion) are part of the armed forces; similarly, the national fire service of Monaco is part of the Military of Monaco and maintains an armoury of sidearms for use by firefighters during civil defence operations.

Another way in which a firefighter's work varies around the world is the nature of firefighting equipment and tactics. For example, American fire departments make heavier use of aerial appliances, and are often split between engine and ladder companies. In Europe, where the size and usefulness of aerial appliances are often limited by narrow streets, they are only used for rescues, and firefighters can rotate between working on an engine and an aerial appliance. A final point in variation is how involved firefighters are in emergency medical services.

== Communication and command structure ==
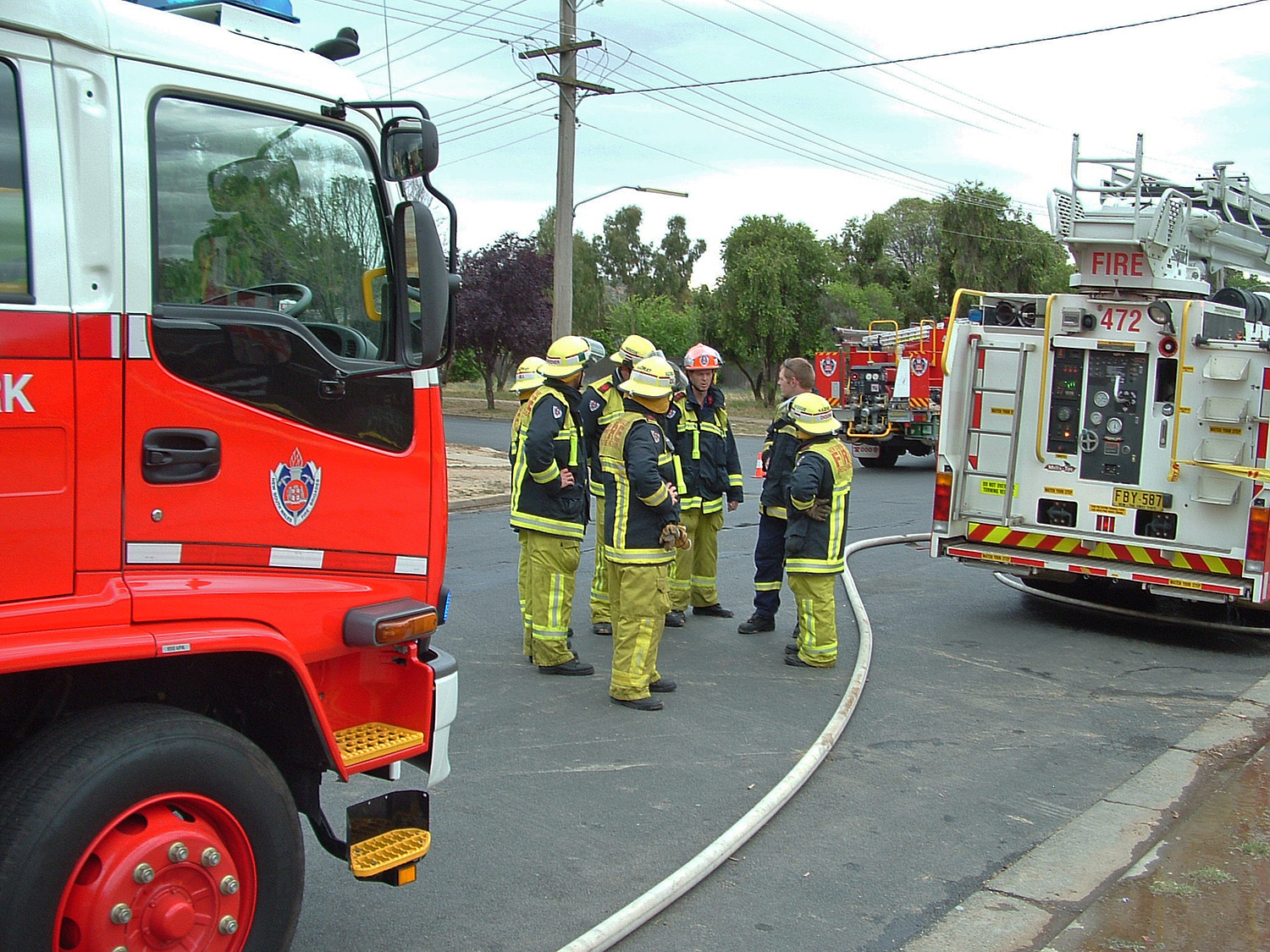
New South Wales Fire Brigade station officer (red helmet) and firefighters (yellow helmets), Australia

The expedient and accurate handling of fire alarms or calls are significant factors in the successful outcome of any incident. Fire department communications play a critical role in that successful outcome. Fire department communications include the methods by which the public can notify the communications center of an emergency, the methods by which the center can notify the proper fire fighting forces, and the methods by which information is exchanged at the scene. One method is to use a megaphone to communicate.

A telecommunicator (often referred to as a 000 Operator in Australia) has a role different from but just as important as other emergency personnel. The telecommunicator must process calls from unknown and unseen individuals, usually calling under stressful conditions. He/she must be able to obtain complete, reliable information from the caller and prioritize requests for assistance. It is the dispatcher's responsibility to bring order to chaos.

While some fire departments are large enough to utilize their own telecommunication dispatcher, most rural and small areas rely on a central dispatcher to provide handling of fire, rescue, and police services.

Firefighters are trained to use communications equipment to receive alarms, give and receive commands, request assistance, and report on conditions. Since firefighters from different agencies routinely provide mutual aid to each other, and routinely operate at incidents where other emergency services are present, it is essential to have structures in place to establish a unified chain of command, and share information between agencies. The U.S. Federal Emergency Management Agency (FEMA) has established a National Incident Management System. One component of this system is the Incident Command System.

All radio communication in the United States is under authorization from the Federal Communications Commission (FCC); as such, fire departments that operate radio equipment must have radio licenses from the FCC.

Ten codes were popular in the early days of radio equipment because of poor transmission and reception. Advances in modern radio technology have reduced the need for ten-codes and many departments have converted to simple English (clear text).

=== Ranks ===
Many firefighters are sworn members with command structures similar to the military or police. They do not usually have general police powers (although some firefighters in the United States have limited police powers, like fire police departments), though certain fire safety officials (such as fire marshals or fire safety inspectors) do possess extensive police powers in connection with their work of enforcement and control in regulatory and emergency situations. In some countries fire fighters carry, or have access to, firearms, including some US fire marshals, and the Corps des Sapeurs-Pompiers of Monaco which is a military unit providing civilian fire cover.

The nomenclature of firefighting varies from country to country. The basic unit of firefighters is known as a "company" in many countries, including the United States, with its members typically working on the same engine. A "crew" or "platoon" is a subdivision of a company who work on the same shift. In British and Commonwealth fire services the firefighters of each station are more typically organised around a "watch" pattern, with several watches (usually four) working on a shift basis, as a separate "crew" for each engine or specialist appliance at that station.

== Firefighter equipment ==
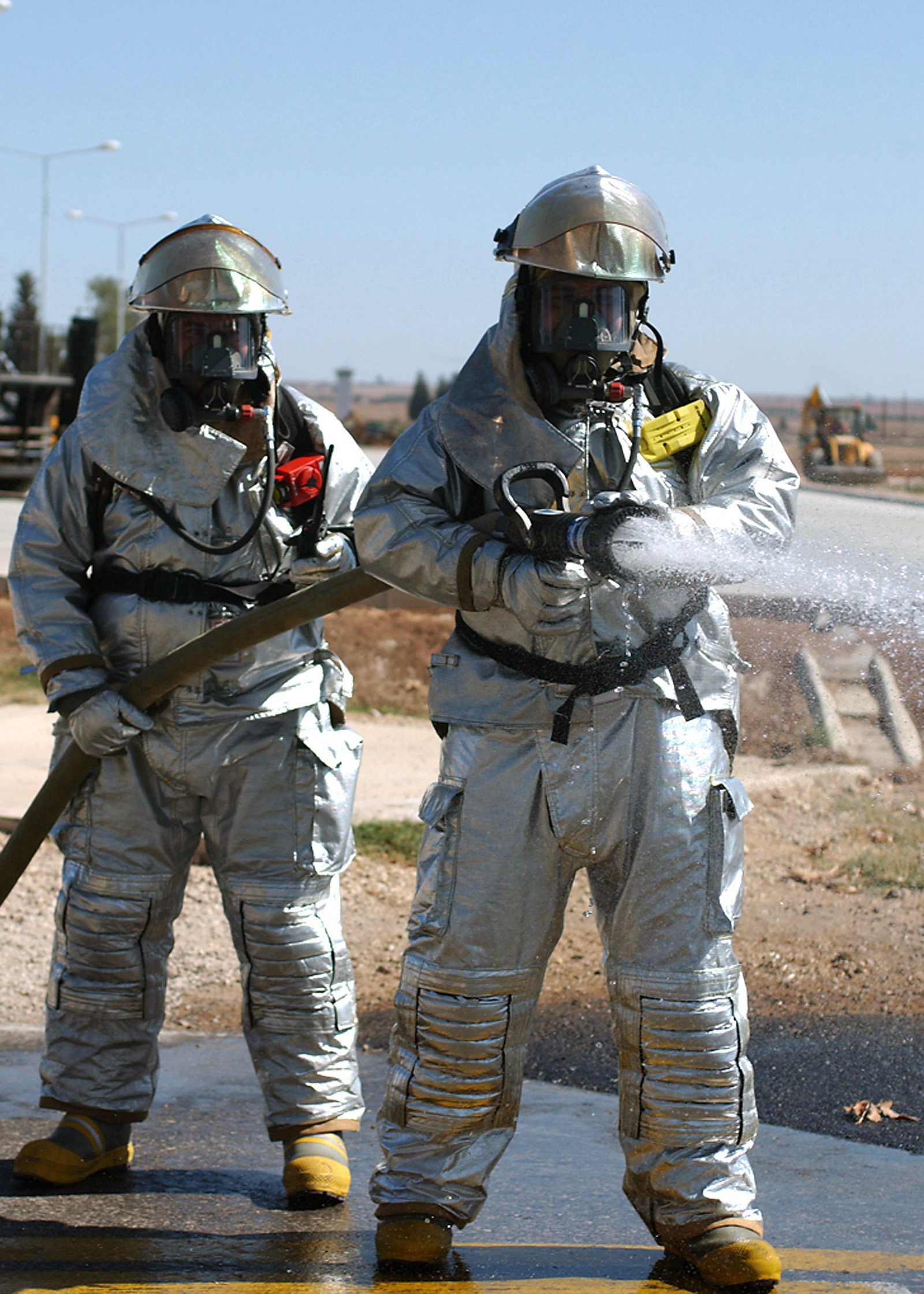
Turkish firefighters in MOPP 4 level protective gear during an exercise held at Incirlik Air Base, Turkey

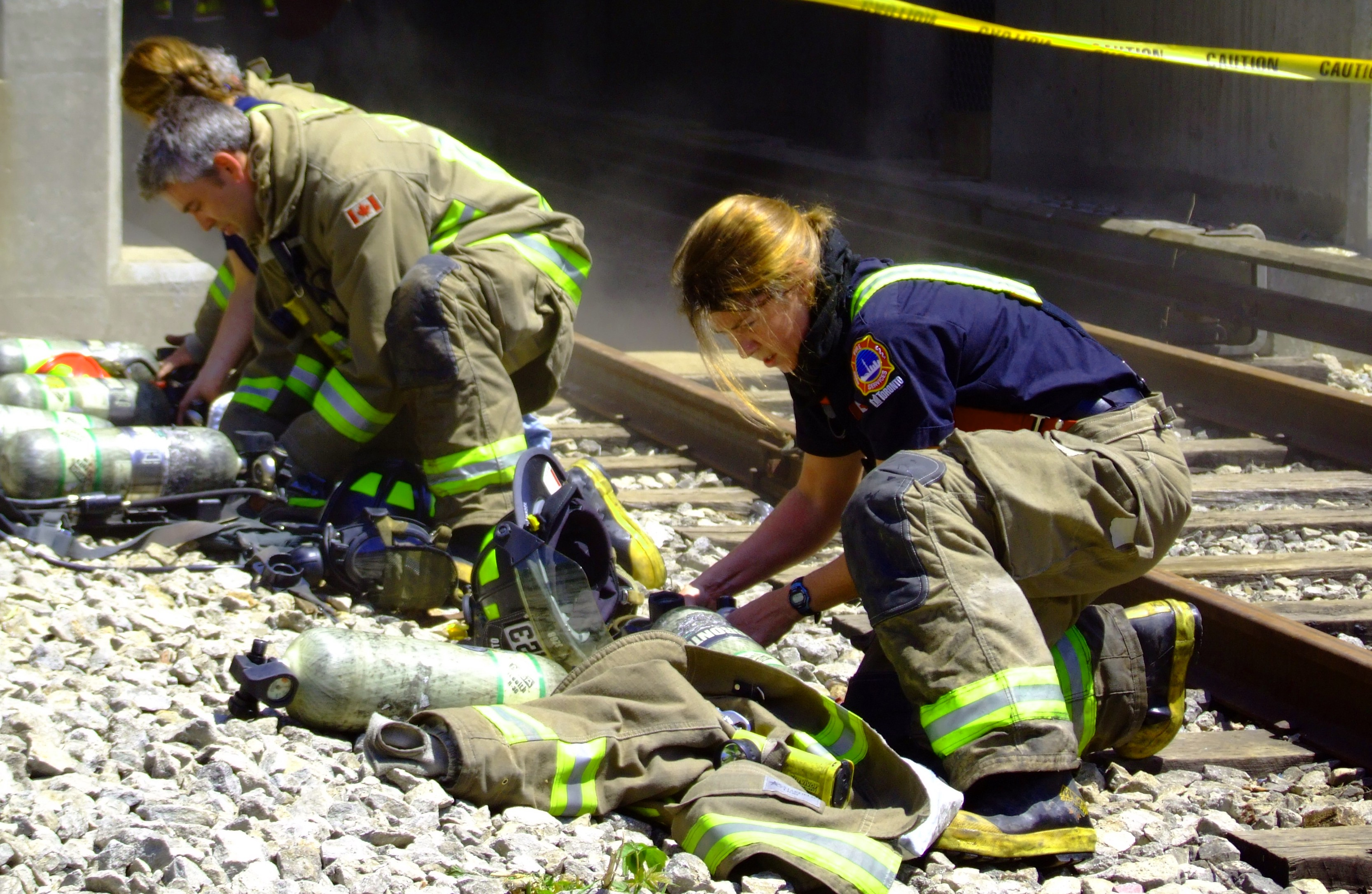
Toronto firefighters prepare their equipment

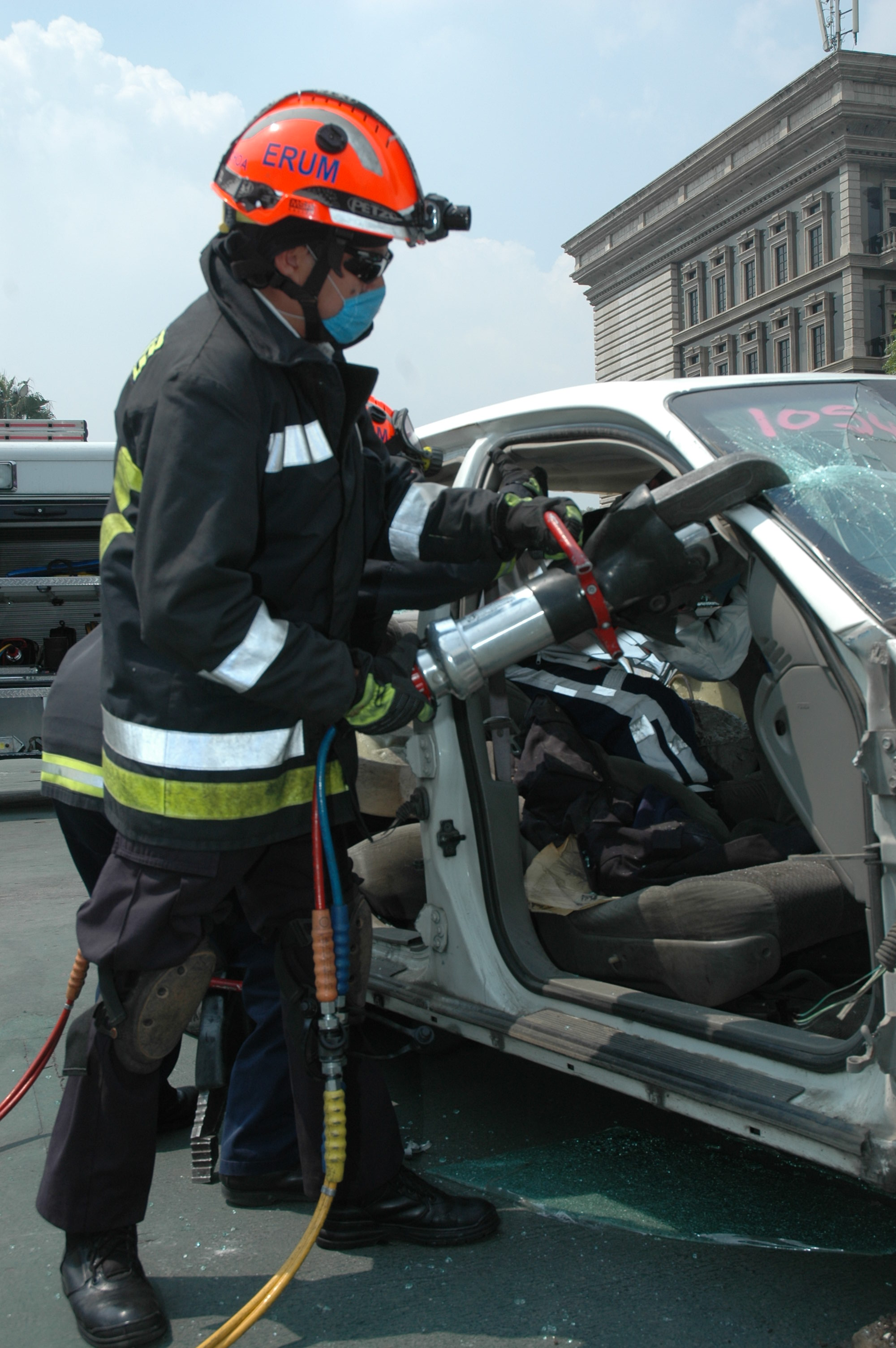
A firefighter using a hydraulic cutter during a demonstration

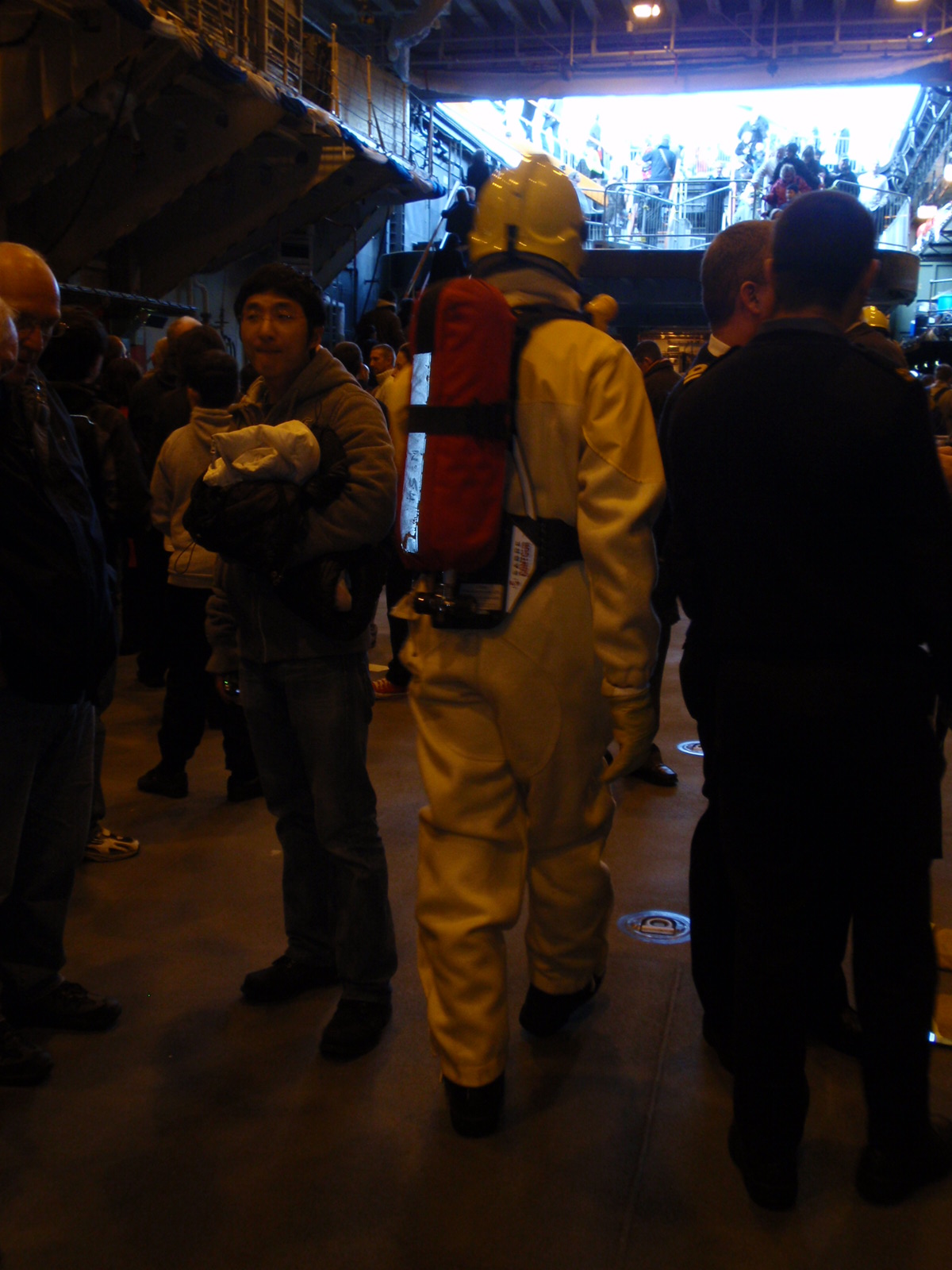
British sailors in firefighting gear on HMS Illustrious (R06), Liverpool, 25 October 2009

A partial list of some equipment typically used by firefighters:

- Hand tools, such as
  - Flat-head and pick-head axe
  - Pike pole
  - Halligan bar
  - Flashlight
  - Spanner wrench
  - Circular ("K-12"), Cutters Edge and chain saws
  - Hydraulic rescue tools such as spreaders, cutters, and rams
- Personal protective equipment ("PPE") designed to withstand water and high temperatures, such as
  - Bunker gear, including turnout jacket and pants
  - Self-contained breathing apparatus (SCBA)
  - Helmet, face mask and visor; climbing helmets
  - Safety boots, gloves, and Nomex and Carbon flash hoods
  - Personal alert safety system (PASS) device
- Handheld radio, pager, or other communication devices
- Thermal imaging camera
- Gas detector

== History ==
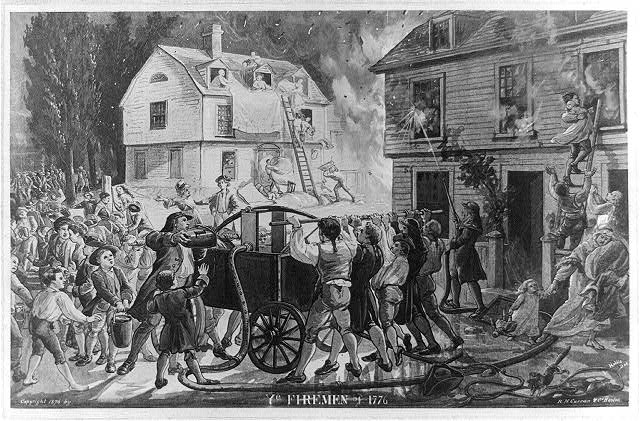
A picture of American firefighters in the 1770s

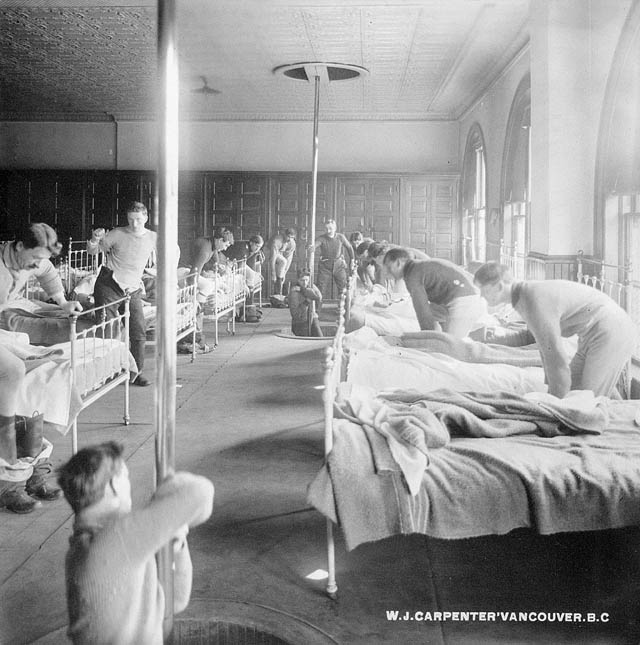
Vancouver firemen responding to a fire alarm, Vancouver, British Columbia, Canada. Photograph taken by W.J. Carpenter in 1910.

Although people have fought fires since there have been valuable things to burn, the first instance of organized professionals combating structural fires occurred in ancient Egypt. Likewise, fire fighters of the Roman Republic existed solely as privately organized and funded groups that operated more similarly to a business than a public service; however, during the Principate period, Augustus revolutionized firefighting by calling for the creation of a fire guard that was trained, paid, and equipped by the state, thereby commissioning the first truly public and professional firefighting service. Known as the Vigiles, they were organised into cohorts, serving as a night watch and city police force in addition to their firefighting duties.

The earliest American fire departments were volunteers, including the volunteer fire company in New Amsterdam, now known as New York. Fire companies were composed of citizens who volunteered their time to help protect the community. As time progressed and new towns were established throughout the region, there was a sharp increase in the number of volunteer departments.

In 1853, the first career fire department in the United States was established in Cincinnati, Ohio, followed four years later by St. Louis Fire Department. Large cities began establishing paid, full-time staff in order to try to facilitate greater call volume.

City fire departments draw their funding directly from city taxes and share the same budget as other public works like the police department and trash services. The primary difference between municipality departments and city departments is the funding source. Municipal fire departments do not share their budget with any other service and are considered to be private entities within a jurisdiction. This means that they have their own taxes that feed into their budgeting needs. City fire departments report to the mayor, whereas municipal departments are accountable to elected board officials who help maintain and run the department along with the chief officer staff.

== Fundraisers ==
Funds for firefighting equipment may be raised by the firefighters themselves, especially in the case of volunteer organizations. Events such as pancake breakfasts and chili feeds are common in the United States. Social events are used to raise money and include dances, fairs, and car washes.

== See also ==
- Firefighting apparatus – Vehicle for use during firefighting operations
- Firefighter arson – Phenomenon of arsonist firefighters
- USAF Firefighting
- Incident Command System – Standardized approach to command, control, and coordination of emergency response
- Index of firefighting articles
- International Firefighters' Day – Observance (May 4)
- Rescue – Operations for life saving, removal from danger and liberation from restraint
  - Search and rescue – Search for and provision of aid to people who are in distress or imminent danger
- Smokejumper – Skydiving wildland firefighters
- Women in firefighting
