= Fire academy =

Type of schoolhouse designed to train firefighters and fire investigators

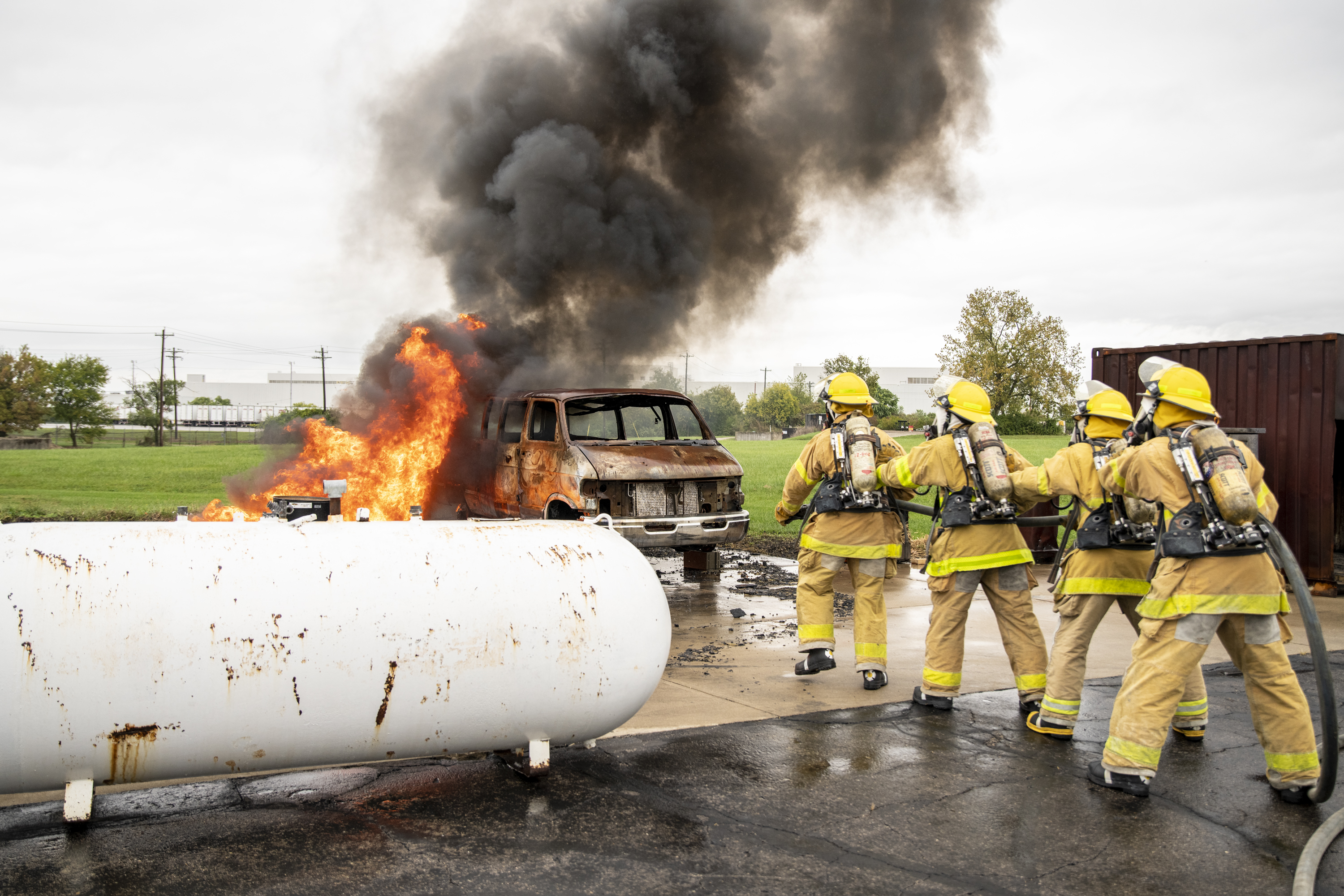
Four fire academy students putting out a vehicle fire.

A fire academy, also known as a fire school, fire drill school, fire training academy, or a firefighting academy, is a schoolhouse, program, or academy designed to train future or current members of a fire department. Fire academies do not only train firefighters or smokejumpers, they also teach fire sciences to train competent fire investigators. Some fire academies will have dedicated criminal investigative wings to train arson investigators and bomb disposal experts, complete with firearms training and education on making arrests of suspected arsonists or bombers, and education on how to be an expert witness in a court. Others will have ambulance training programs. The first ever fire drill school was established in Boston in 1889. The first fire officer training college was established in New York City in 1914.

== See also ==
- Police academy
- Nurse education
- Military academy
- National Fire Academy
- Washington State Fire Training Academy
