= Automatic message exchange =

Automatic message exchange (AME): In an adaptive high-frequency (HF) radio network, an automated process allowing the transfer of a message from message injection to addressee reception, without human intervention. Through the use of machine-addressable transport guidance information, i.e., the message header, the message is automatically routed through an on-line direct connection through single or multiple transmission media.
