= Two-way alternating =

Communications channel

Two-way alternating communications is a term sometimes used to disambiguate the term Duplex (telecommunications). In a two-way alternating communications channel, each endpoint can either send or receive at any given time, but cannot send and receive at the same time. Two-way simultaneous communications lets the endpoints talk and listen simultaneously.

Two-way alternating communications are sometimes called half-duplex, but there may be a fine distinction that two-way alternating communications is a property of the communication protocol used between the endpoints, while the underlying communications medium may support either two-way alternating or two-way simultaneous communications. When the medium is shared for transmitting and receiving, it can only support two-way alternating protocols, and the medium may be called physically half-duplex.
