= Mechanically induced modulation =

Noise created in a multimode fiber by an imperfect splice

Mechanically induced modulation is an optical signal modulation induced by mechanical means.

An example of deleterious mechanically induced modulation is speckle noise created in a multimode fiber by an imperfect splice or imperfectly mated connectors. Mechanical disturbance of the fiber ahead of the joint will introduce changes in the modal structure, resulting in variations of joint loss. This is a subset of many mechanisms that can lead to modal noise in an optical system.
