= Telecommunications equipment =

Hardware used for telecommunication purposes

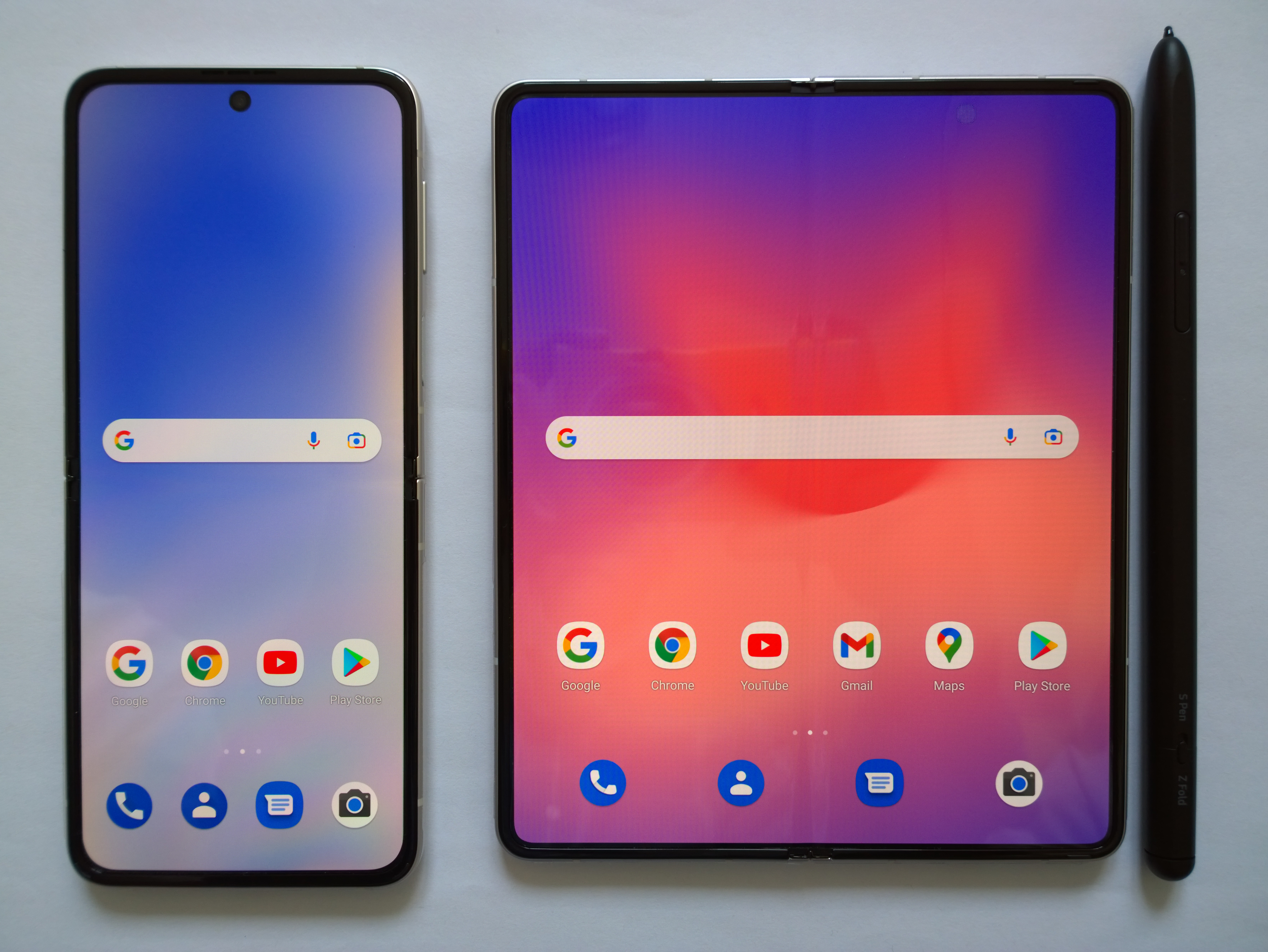
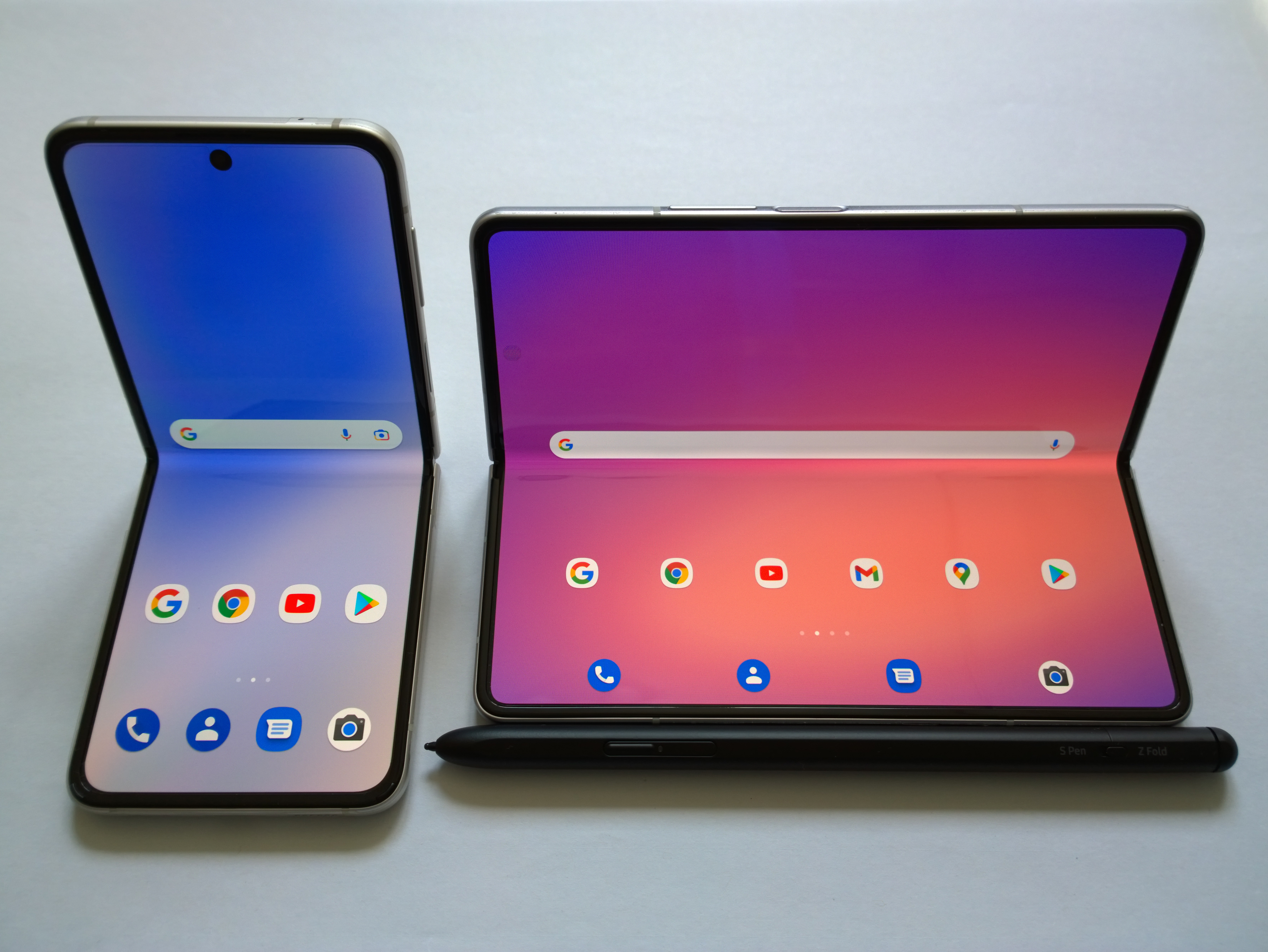
Smartphones are one of the most popular telecoms equipment.

Telecommunications equipment (also telecoms equipment or communications equipment) is a type of hardware which is used for the purposes of telecommunications. Since the 1990s the boundary between telecoms equipment and IT hardware has become blurred as a result of the growth of the internet and its increasing role in the transfer of telecoms data.

== Types ==
Telecommunications equipment can be broadly broken down into the following categories:

- Public switching equipment
  - Analogue switches
  - Digital switches
    - Voice over IP switches
    - Virtual reality (VR)
- Transmission equipment
  - Transmission lines
    - Optical fiber
    - Local loops
  - Base transceiver stations
  - Free-space optical communication
    - Laser communication in space
  - Multiplexers
  - Communications satellites
- Customer premises equipment (CPE)
  - Customer office terminal
  - Private switches
  - Local area networks (LANs)
  - Modems
  - Mobile phones
  - Landline telephones
  - Answering machines
  - Teleprinters
  - Fax machines
  - Pagers
  - Routers
  - Wireless devices

== Semiconductors ==
Most of the essential elements of modern telecommunication are built from MOSFETs (metal–oxide–semiconductor field-effect transistors), including mobile devices, transceivers, base station modules, routers, RF power amplifiers, microprocessors, memory chips, and telecommunication circuits. As of 2005, telecommunications equipment account for 16.5% of the annual microprocessor market.

== Vendors ==
The world's largest telecommunications equipment vendors by revenues in 2017 are:

Largest vendors by 2017 revenue (billion US dollars)
(China) Huawei	$92.55
(United States) Cisco Systems	$48.00
(United States) Ciena	$38.57
(Finland) Nokia	$27.73
(Israel) ECI Telecom	$24.16
(Japan) NEC Corporation	$23.95
(United States) Qualcomm	$22.297
(China) ZTE	$16.71
(United States) Corning	$10.12
(United States) Motorola Solutions	$6.38
(United States) Juniper Networks	$5.03

Largest by country (2017)
United States	$94.62
Japan	$62.52
Finland	$27.73
Sweden	$24.16

In addition to the global suppliers, Indian companies such as HFCL provide telecom equipment and fibre-optic connectivity solutions for service providers, enterprises, and public-sector networks.

== See also ==
- Networking hardware
- List of networking hardware vendors
- List of telephone switches
- Network equipment provider
