= Bilateral synchronization =

Telephony synchronization technique

== Bilateral Synchronization in Telecommunications ==
In telecommunications, bilateral synchronization (or bilateral control) refers to a synchronization control system used between two exchanges (A and B). In this system, the clock at exchange A controls the data received at exchange B, while the clock at exchange B controls the data received at exchange A. This two-way synchronization ensures that data transmission between both exchanges remains aligned, minimizing errors caused by timing mismatches.

This type of synchronization is commonly implemented by deriving the timing from the incoming bitstream. The bitstream, which contains data bits transmitted between the exchanges, serves as the reference from which the timing information is extracted. By using this method, bilateral synchronization helps maintain consistent timing and prevents data corruption during transmission.

=== Technical Overview ===
Bilateral synchronization plays a crucial role in ensuring the reliable transfer of data between different nodes in a telecommunications network. It ensures that each exchange accurately interprets the data stream it receives, based on the timing reference from the opposite exchange.

==== Process ====
- Exchange A derives the clock from the incoming bitstream and uses it to regulate the data received at Exchange B.
- Similarly, Exchange B extracts the clock timing from the bitstream it receives and uses it to synchronize the data transmission to Exchange A.

By keeping both clocks in sync, bilateral synchronization ensures that data packets are properly timed for accurate reception and processing at both ends of the communication chain.

=== Applications ===
Bilateral synchronization is critical in various telecommunications systems, including:

- Switching Systems: Ensuring synchronized data transmission between different switches.
- Digital Communication: Maintaining alignment between signals in networks like T1 and E1.
- Packet-Switched Networks: Ensuring time synchronization between network nodes to avoid packet loss or delay.

=== Bilateral Synchronization vs. Other Synchronization Techniques ===
Bilateral synchronization is often compared to other synchronization methods, such as plesiochronous and synchronous systems.

- Plesiochronous Digital Hierarchy (PDH): In plesiochronous systems, clocks at different exchanges or network nodes are nearly the same, but not exactly synchronized. PDH systems are commonly used in legacy telecom networks and can tolerate slight timing differences.
- Synchronous Systems: Unlike bilateral synchronization, synchronous systems rely on a single, central clock to synchronize the data transmission across the entire network. These systems tend to be more precise than plesiochronous systems but may require more complex infrastructure.

=== Bilateral Synchronization in Practice ===
Bilateral synchronization is particularly effective in systems where there is a need for precision timing between two points, without the complexity of a centralized synchronization model. It allows for flexibility and adaptability in systems that handle large volumes of data, such as in the telecommunications backbone, where data streams from multiple sources need to be kept in sync across various nodes.

=== Challenges ===
While bilateral synchronization can offer advantages, it also poses challenges, including:

- Latency: The time taken to extract timing from the bitstream can introduce latency in the communication process.
- Network Design: Ensuring bilateral synchronization across large networks can be complex, requiring precise configuration of each exchange’s clock and its relation to other exchanges.
