= Primary station =

In a data communication network, the primary station is the station responsible for unbalanced control of a data link.

The primary station generates commands and interprets responses, and is responsible for initialization of data and control information interchange, organization and control of data flow, retransmission control, and all recovery functions at the link level.
