= Coded set =

Secret communications

In telecommunications, a coded set is a set of elements onto which another set of elements has been mapped according to a code.

Examples of coded sets include the list of names of airports that is mapped onto a set of corresponding three-letter representations of airport names, the list of classes of emission that is mapped onto a set of corresponding standard symbols, and the names of the months of the year mapped onto a set of two-digit decimal numbers.

This article incorporates public domain material from Federal Standard 1037C. General Services Administration. Archived from the original on 2022-01-22.
