= Group alerting and dispatching system =

In telecommunications, a group alerting and dispatching system is a service feature that (a) enables a controlling telephone to place a call to a specified number of telephones simultaneously, (b) enables the call to be recorded, (c) if any of the called lines is busy, enables the equipment to camp on until the busy line is free, and (d) rings the free line and plays the recorded message.

This article incorporates public domain material from Federal Standard 1037C. General Services Administration. Archived from the original on 2022-01-22.
