= Spatial application =

A spatial application is a technological application (such as video) requiring high spatial resolution, possibly at the expense of reduced temporal positioning accuracy, such as increased jerkiness.

Examples of spatial applications include the requirement to display small characters and to resolve fine detail in still video, or in motion video that contains very limited motion.
