= Exempted addressee =

In telecommunications, an exempted addressee is an organization, activity, or person included in the collective address group of a message and deemed by the message originator as having no need for the information in the message.

Exempted addressees may be explicitly excluded from the collective address group for the particular message to which the exemption applies.
