= Functional profile =

In telecommunications, a functional profile is a standardization document that characterizes the requirements of a standard or group of standards, and specifies how the options and ambiguities in the standard(s) should be interpreted or implemented to (a) provide a particular information technology function, (b) provide for the development of uniform, recognized tests, and (c) promote interoperability among different network elements and terminal equipment that implement a specific profile.

== Sources ==
This article incorporates public domain material from Federal Standard 1037C. General Services Administration. Archived from the original on 2022-01-22.
