= Customer office terminal =

In telecommunications, the term customer office terminal has the following meanings:

- 1. Termination equipment that (a) is located on the customer premises and (b) performs a function that may be integrated into the common carrier equipment.

Note: An example of a customer office terminal is a stand-alone multiplexer located on the customer premises.

- 2. The digital loop carrier (DLC) multiplexing function that is near the exchange termination (ET) when provided by a stand-alone multiplexer.

Note: This function may be integrated into the ET.
