= Micro-mainframe link =

In telecommunications, a micro-mainframe link is a physical or logical connection established between a remote microprocessor and mainframe host computer for the express purpose of uploading, downloading, or viewing interactive data and databases on-line in real time.

Note: A micro-mainframe link usually requires terminal emulation software on the microcomputer.
