= Automatic gain control =

Electronic circuit to automatically adjust signal strength

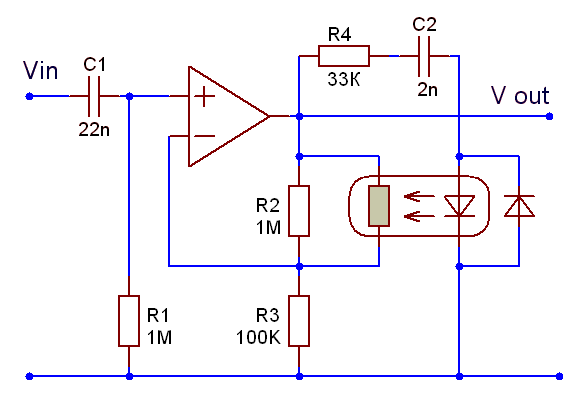
Schematic of an AGC used in the analog telephone network; the feedback from output level to gain is effected via a Vactrol resistive opto-isolator.

Automatic gain control (AGC), sometimes Automatic volume control (AVC) is a closed-loop feedback regulating circuit in an amplifier or chain of amplifiers, the purpose of which is to maintain a suitable signal amplitude at its output, despite variation of the signal amplitude at the input. The average or peak output signal level is used to dynamically adjust the gain of the amplifiers, enabling the circuit to work satisfactorily with a greater range of input signal levels. It is used in most radio receivers to equalize the average volume (loudness) of different radio stations due to differences in received signal strength, as well as variations in a single station's radio signal due to fading. Without AGC the sound emitted from an AM radio receiver would vary to an extreme extent from a weak to a strong signal; the AGC effectively reduces the volume if the signal is strong and raises it when it is weaker. In a typical receiver, the AGC feedback control signal is usually taken from the detector stage and applied to control the gain of the IF or RF amplifier stages.

== How it works ==
The signal to be gain controlled (the detector output in a radio) goes to a diode & capacitor, which produce a peak-following DC voltage. This is fed to the RF gain blocks to alter their bias, thus altering their gain. Traditionally all the gain-controlled stages came before the signal detection, but it is also possible to improve gain control by adding a gain-controlled stage after signal detection.

== Example use cases ==
=== AM radio receivers ===
In 1925, Harold Alden Wheeler developed an automatic volume control (AVC) system and later received U.S. Patent 1,866,687 for the invention. The patented system used a relay in the radio-frequency (RF) current path; detector plate current actuated the relay to regulate receiver gain. In a 1928 paper, Wheeler introduced a fully electronic version that eliminated the mechanical relay. In this design, the carrier signal was rectified, audio-frequency components were filtered out, and the resulting DC control voltage was applied to the grids of earlier RF amplifier stages. He selected a control time constant of about 1/40 second, allowing the circuit to follow signal fading while rejecting modulation variations. Although the actuator changed from mechanical to electronic, the underlying principle—deriving a control voltage from the carrier to regulate RF gain automatically—remained the same. Karl Küpfmüller published an analysis of AGC systems in 1928. By the early 1930s most new commercial broadcast receivers included automatic volume control. In 1980, Electronics magazine listed Wheeler’s AVC among twelve “classic circuits” fundamental to the commercialization of radio and television.

Properly implemented automatic gain control (AGC) preserves the linearity of an AM receiver. In normal operation the RF and IF stages operate in their linear regions, so the detected audio waveform remains proportional to the modulation envelope of the carrier. AGC adjusts overall gain in response to changes in average carrier strength; it does not intentionally modify the instantaneous modulation waveform.

To prevent distortion, the AGC control voltage must vary much more slowly than the modulation. Terman noted that the AVC time constant “must be great enough that the lowest modulation frequencies do not reach the AVC output,” and recommended values on the order of 1/5 to 1/10 second for broadcast receivers. If the AGC loop responds at audio frequencies, it will follow the modulation envelope and alter instantaneous gain, producing distortion or “modulation rise.”

Some practical design choices can also introduce distortion. The Radiotron Designer’s Handbook discusses effects such as delayed AVC loading, detector impedance interactions, and inappropriate time-constant selection, all of which can impair fidelity if not properly designed. These effects arise from implementation details rather than from the AGC principle itself.

The AGC circuit maintains a relatively constant output level by detecting the average strength of the received signal and adjusting receiver gain accordingly. For weak signals, the receiver operates at maximum gain; as signal strength increases, the AGC progressively reduces gain. In many designs, gain reduction occurs primarily in IF or later RF stages. Reducing gain in the RF front end on weak signals can degrade signal-to-noise ratio and increase susceptibility to blocking, so front-end gain is often left at maximum until stronger signals are present.

The detector diode produces a DC voltage proportional to carrier strength. This voltage is filtered and fed back to earlier stages to control gain. Proper selection of time constants prevents modulation components from influencing the control voltage.

Communications receivers may employ more elaborate AVC systems, including delayed AVC, separate AGC detector stages, multiple time constants, and distribution of control voltage to selected stages to reduce distortion and cross-modulation. The design of the AVC system strongly influences tuning behavior, overload performance, and audio fidelity.

=== FM radio receivers ===
FM receivers, even though they incorporate limiter stages and detectors that are relatively insensitive to amplitude variations, still benefit from AGC to prevent overload on strong signals.

=== Radar ===
A related application of AGC is in radar systems, as a method of overcoming unwanted clutter echoes. This method relies on the fact that clutter returns far outnumber echoes from targets of interest. The receiver's gain is automatically adjusted to maintain a constant level of overall visible clutter. While this does not help detect targets masked by stronger surrounding clutter, it does help to distinguish strong target sources. In the past, radar AGC was electronically controlled and affected the gain of the entire radar receiver. As radars evolved, AGC became computer-software controlled, and affected the gain with greater granularity, in specific detection cells. Many radar countermeasures use a radar's AGC to fool it, by effectively "drowning out" the real signal with the spoof, as the AGC will regard the weaker, true signal as clutter relative to the strong spoof.

=== Audio/video ===
An audio tape generates a certain amount of noise. If the level of the signal on the tape is low, the noise is more prominent, i.e., the signal-to-noise ratio is lower than it could be. To produce the least noisy recording, the recording level should be set as high as possible without being so high as to clip or distort the signal. In professional high-fidelity recording the level is set manually using a peak-reading meter. When high fidelity is not a requirement, a suitable recording level can be set by an AGC circuit which reduces the gain as the average signal level increases. This allows a usable recording to be made even for speech some distance from the microphone of an audio recorder. Similar considerations apply with VCRs.

A potential disadvantage of AGC is that when recording something like music with quiet and loud passages such as classical music, the AGC will tend to make the quiet passages louder and the loud passages quieter, compressing the dynamic range; the result can be a reduced musical quality if the signal is not re-expanded when playing, as in a companding system.

Some reel-to-reel tape recorders and cassette decks have AGC circuits. Those used for high-fidelity generally don't.

Most VCR circuits use the amplitude of the vertical blanking pulse to operate the AGC. Video copy control schemes such as Macrovision exploit this, inserting spikes in the pulse which will be ignored by most television sets, but cause a VCR's AGC to overcorrect and corrupt the recording.

=== Vogad ===
A voice-operated gain-adjusting device or volume-operated gain-adjusting device (vogad) is a type of AGC or compressor for microphone amplification. It is usually used in radio transmitters to prevent overmodulation and to reduce the dynamic range of the signal which allows increasing average transmitted power. In telephony, this device takes a wide variety of input amplitudes and produces a generally consistent output amplitude.

In its simplest form, a limiter can consist of a pair of back-to-back clamp diodes, which simply shunt excess signal amplitude to ground when the diode conduction threshold is exceeded. This approach will simply clip off the top of large signals, leading to high levels of distortion.

While clipping limiters are often used as a form of last-ditch protection against overmodulation, a properly designed vogad circuit actively controls the amount of gain to optimise the modulation depth in real time. As well as preventing overmodulation, it boosts the level of quiet signals so that undermodulation is also avoided. Undermodulation can lead to poor signal penetration in noisy conditions, consequently vogad is particularly important for voice applications such as radiotelephones.

A good vogad circuit must have a very fast attack time, so that an initial loud voice signal does not cause a sudden burst of excessive modulation. In practice the attack time will be a few milliseconds, so a clipping limiter is still sometimes needed to catch the signal on these short peaks. A much longer decay time is usually employed, so that the gain does not get boosted too quickly during the normal pauses in natural speech. Too short a decay time leads to the phenomenon of "breathing" where the background noise level gets boosted at each gap in the speech. Vogad circuits are normally adjusted so that at low levels of input the signal is not fully boosted, but instead follow a linear boost curve. This works well with noise cancelling microphones.

=== Telephone recording ===
Devices to record both sides of a telephone conversation must record both the relatively large signal from the local user and the much smaller signal from the remote user at comparable loudnesses. Some telephone recording devices incorporate automatic gain control to produce acceptable-quality recordings.

=== Biological ===
As is the case with many concepts found in engineering, automatic gain control is also found in biological systems, especially sensory systems. For example, in the vertebrate visual system, calcium dynamics in the retinal photoreceptors adjust gain to suit light levels. Further on in the visual system, cells in V1 are thought to mutually inhibit, causing normalization of responses to contrast, a form of automatic gain control. Similarly, in the auditory system, the olivocochlear efferent neurons are part of a biomechanical gain control loop.

== Recovery times ==
As in all automatic control systems, the temporal dynamics of AGC operation may be important in many applications. Some AGC systems are slow to react to the need for gain changes, while others may react very rapidly. An example of an application in which fast AGC recovery time is required is in receivers used in Morse code communications where so-called full break-in or QSK operation is necessary to enable receiving stations to interrupt sending stations mid-character (e.g. between dot and dash signals).

== See also ==
- Companding
- Clipping (audio)
- Dynamic range compression
- Gain compression
- High dynamic range
- Squelch
- Glossary of video terms
