= Limiter =

Electronic amplitude-limiting device

Comparison of soft and hard clipping.

In electronics, a limiter is a circuit that allows signals below a specified input power or level to pass unaffected while attenuating (lowering) the peaks of stronger signals that exceed this threshold. Limiting is a type of dynamic range compression. Clipping is an extreme version of limiting.

Limiting is any process by which the amplitude of a signal is prevented from exceeding a predetermined value.

Limiters are common as a safety device in broadcast applications to prevent overmodulation and in audio mastering to avoid digital clipping, lossy coding errors, or the phonograph needle from jumping out of the groove. Limiters are also used as protective features in some components of sound reinforcement systems (e.g., powered mixing boards and power amplifiers) and in some bass amplifiers, to prevent unwanted distortion or loudspeaker damage.

== Types ==
Limiting can refer to a range of treatments designed to limit the maximum level of a signal. Treatments in order of decreasing severity range from clipping, in which a signal is passed through normally but sheared off when it would normally exceed a certain threshold; soft clipping which squashes peaks instead of shearing them; a hard limiter, a type of variable-gain audio level compression, in which the gain of an amplifier is changed very quickly to prevent the signal from going over a certain amplitude or a soft limiter which reduces maximum output through gain compression.

== Usage ==
=== In aerospace and military ===
For military two-way radio sets and aircraft VHF voice telecommunications, the voice limiter is known as a vogad. It is designed to work with high levels of background noise near the microphone. One form operates by up-converting the audio signal to an ultrasonic frequency, hard limiting that signal, and then down converting the result. The frequency conversion uses image-cancelling heterodyning. The advantage of clipping the supersonic signal is that the odd harmonics produced will still be out-of-band when down converted. This is in contrast to standard hard limiting, as in an electric guitar fuzz box, where the harmonics are highly audible. This device ultimately gives a distinctive character to the voice communication, which, despite being highly distorted, ensures spoken words remain clear.

=== In audio production ===
Bass instrument amplifiers and power amplifiers are more commonly equipped with limiter circuitry to prevent overloading the power amplifier and to protect speakers. Electric guitar amps do not usually have limiters.

PIN diodes can be used in limiter circuits to reflect the energy back to the source or clip the signal.

Mastering engineers often use limiting combined with make-up gain to increase the perceived loudness of an audio recording during the audio mastering process.

==== FM radio ====
An FM radio receiver usually has at least one stage of amplification that performs a limiting function. This stage provides a constant level of signal to the FM demodulator stage, reducing the effect of input signal level changes to the output. If two or more signals are received at the same time, a high-performance limiter stage can greatly reduce the effect of the weaker signals on the output. This is commonly referred to as the FM capture effect.

Generally, FM demodulators are not affected by amplitude variations, since the baseband is contained in the frequency deviations. Some detectors, including the ratio detector, inherently limit gain by the nature of the circuit design. In AM radio, the information is located in the amplitude variations, and distortion can occur due to spurious signals that could cause the baseband to be misrepresented.

=== In utilities ===
In Canada, while the cold weather rule is in effect, limiters are used to lower the capacity of houses of non-paying customers. The limiters allow enough power to run a furnace and a few lights. Tampering with the limiter is illegal.

== See also ==
- Clipper (electronics)
- Flow limiter
- Negative feedback
- Variable-gain amplifier
