= Stabistor =

Semiconductor diode

The stabistor (also called a forward reference diode) is the technical term used to designate a special type of semiconductor silicon diode featuring extremely stable forward voltage characteristics. These devices are specially designed for low-voltage stabilization applications requiring a guaranteed voltage over a wide current range and highly stable over temperature. In these applications, stabistors offer improved dynamic impedance (voltage change vs. current) than low voltage zener diodes where tunneling instead of avalanche current is dominant. Other typical applications include bias stabilization in class-AB output stages, clipping, clamping, meter protection, etc.

== Production ==
Stabistors are manufactured using planar epitaxial technology and a typical device is the BAS17, manufactured by several semiconductor companies. Devices are also available with multiple diodes connected in series inside a single package offering higher forward voltages than a single device but lower than those obtained using standard zener diodes.

== See also ==
- Zener diode
- Avalanche diode
- Voltage regulator
