= Clamper =

A clamper can mean:

- A clamper, an electronic circuit.
- A spiked plate worn on the sole of the shoe to prevent slipping when walking on ice.
- A person who applies a wheel clamp to a vehicle parked illegally or on private land.
- A person who belongs to the Ancient and Honorable Society of E Clampus Vitus.
- A character in Trolls World Tour.
