= Attack time =

In professional audio and telecommunications, attack time is the time between the instant that a signal at the input of a device or circuit exceeds the activation threshold of the device or circuit and the instant that the device or circuit reacts in a specified manner, or to a specified degree, to the input. Attack time occurs in devices such as clippers, peak limiters, compressors, and voxes.

== See also ==
- Attack-time delay
- Envelope (music)
- Fall time
- Overshoot (signal)
