= CHRNA10 =

Protein-coding gene in humans

Identifiers
- Aliases: CHRNA10, cholinergic receptor nicotinic alpha 10 subunit
- External IDs: OMIM: 606372; MGI: 3609260; GeneCards: CHRNA10

Gene location (Human)
Chr.	Chromosome 11 (human)
Band	11p15.4	Start	3,665,587 bp
Band	11p15.4	End	3,671,384 bp

Gene location (Mouse)
Chr.	Chromosome 7 (mouse)
Band	7|7 E2	Start	101,760,473 bp
Band	7|7 E2	End	101,766,035 bp
RNA expression pattern
Bgee	Human / Mouse (ortholog); Top expressed in: gastrocnemius muscle; muscle of thigh; gonad; testicle; granulocyte; mucosa of transverse colon; blood; right lobe of liver; cerebellar hemisphere; right hemisphere of cerebellum / Top expressed in: embryo; olfactory bulb; muscle of thigh; muscle tissue; quadriceps femoris muscle; skeletal muscle tissue; blastocyst; spermatocyte; lip; esophagus; More reference expression data
BioGPS	n/a
Gene ontology
Molecular function	calcium channel activity; ion channel activity; signaling receptor binding; extracellular ligand-gated ion channel activity; acetylcholine-gated cation-selective channel activity; transmembrane signaling receptor activity; transmitter-gated ion channel activity involved in regulation of postsynaptic membrane potential
Cellular component	integral component of membrane; perikaryon; postsynaptic membrane; membrane; plasma membrane; synapse; axon; cell junction; cholinergic synapse; integral component of postsynaptic specialization membrane; integral component of plasma membrane; neuron projection
Biological process	positive regulation of cytosolic calcium ion concentration; synaptic transmission, cholinergic; ion transport; detection of mechanical stimulus involved in sensory perception of sound; regulation of cell population proliferation; calcium ion transmembrane transport; inner ear morphogenesis; calcium ion transport; regulation of postsynaptic membrane potential; excitatory postsynaptic potential; signal transduction; ion transmembrane transport; negative regulation of ERK1 and ERK2 cascade; chemical synaptic transmission; regulation of membrane potential; nervous system process
Sources:Amigo / QuickGO
Orthologs
Databases	NCBI: entry; OMA: entry
Species	Human	Mouse
Entrez	57053	504186
Ensembl	ENSG00000129749	ENSMUSG00000066279
UniProt	Q9GZZ6	n/a
RefSeq (mRNA)	NM_001303034; NM_001303035; NM_020402	NM_001081424
RefSeq (protein)	NP_001289963; NP_001289964; NP_065135	n/a
Location (UCSC)	Chr 11: 3.67 – 3.67 Mb	Chr 7: 101.76 – 101.77 Mb
PubMed search
- Wikidata
View/Edit Human	View/Edit Mouse

Neuronal acetylcholine receptor subunit alpha-10, also known as nAChRα10 and cholinergic receptor nicotinic alpha 10, is a protein that in humans is encoded by the CHRNA10 gene. The protein encoded by this gene is a subunit of certain nicotinic acetylcholine receptors (nAchR).

This nAchR subunit is required for the normal function of the olivocochlear system which is part of the auditory system. Furthermore, selective block of α9α10 nicotinic acetylcholine receptors by the conotoxin RgIA has been shown to be analgesic in an animal model of nerve injury pain.

α10 subunit-containing receptors are notably blocked by nicotine. The role of this antagonism in the effects of tobacco are unknown.
