= Cold weather rule =

Law stopping utility companies from cutting heat in extreme weather

A cold weather rule (CWR) or cold weather law is a regulation that prohibits public utility companies from disconnecting customers who are unable to pay for the energy used to heat their homes during the winter. Such regulations may also require utility companies to reconnect customers during those periods.

Cold weather rules help prevent damage to homes. Winter temperatures can freeze water pipes, potentially causing bursts in the lines as the water inside expands as it turns into ice. Cleaning up after this can lay heavy burdens upon people who are already of limited financial means.

== In Canada ==
In Canada, electricity cannot be turned off between October 15 and April 15, or any time the temperature goes below 0 degrees Celsius. Limiters can be installed in houses of non-paying user, which disable all but the furnace and a few lights. Tampering with the limiter is illegal.

== In the United States ==
Several U.S. states have such rules, including Kansas, Minnesota, and Missouri. The protection provided by a cold weather rule may not be automatic, and poor customers may have to register with their service provider to indicate either a complete inability to pay or to set up a special payment plan.

In Minnesota, the rule is in effect between October 15 and April 15 of the next year, and requires reconnection of electricity and/or natural gas depending on which energy sources are necessary for heat. The state's Public Utilities Commission doesn't regulate liquefied petroleum gas or oil, so those services may not be provided. However, if an LP- or oil-fired heater requires electricity in order to function, the rule requires electrical service to be reconnected.
