= Lr-diode =

A LR-Diode circuit exhibits non-linear behavior and demonstrates chaotic behavior. By adjusting the amplitude of the driving frequency one can see period doubling, and eventually chaos.

== See also ==
- Chaos theory
- Logistic map
