= Attack-time delay =

Time for a receiver or transmitter to respond to a signal

In telecommunications, attack-time delay is the time needed for a receiver or transmitter to respond to an incoming signal.

For a receiver, the attack-time delay is defined as the time interval from the instant a step radio-frequency signal, at a level equal to the receiver's threshold of sensitivity, is applied to the receiver input, to the instant when the receiver's output amplitude reaches 90% of its steady-state value. If a squelch circuit is operating, the receiver attack-time delay includes the time for the receiver to break squelch.

For a transmitter, the attack-time delay is defined as the interval from the instant the transmitter is keyed-on to the instant the transmitted radio-frequency signal amplitude has increased to a specified level, usually 90% of its key-on steady-state value. The transmitter attack-time delay excludes the time required for automatic antenna tuning.

== See also ==
- Transmit-after-receive time delay
- Receive-after-transmit time delay
