= Amplitude gate =

An amplitude gate (also, slicer or slice amplifier) is a circuit whose output is only the part of the input signal that lies between two amplitude boundary level values.
