= Diode =

Two-terminal electronic component

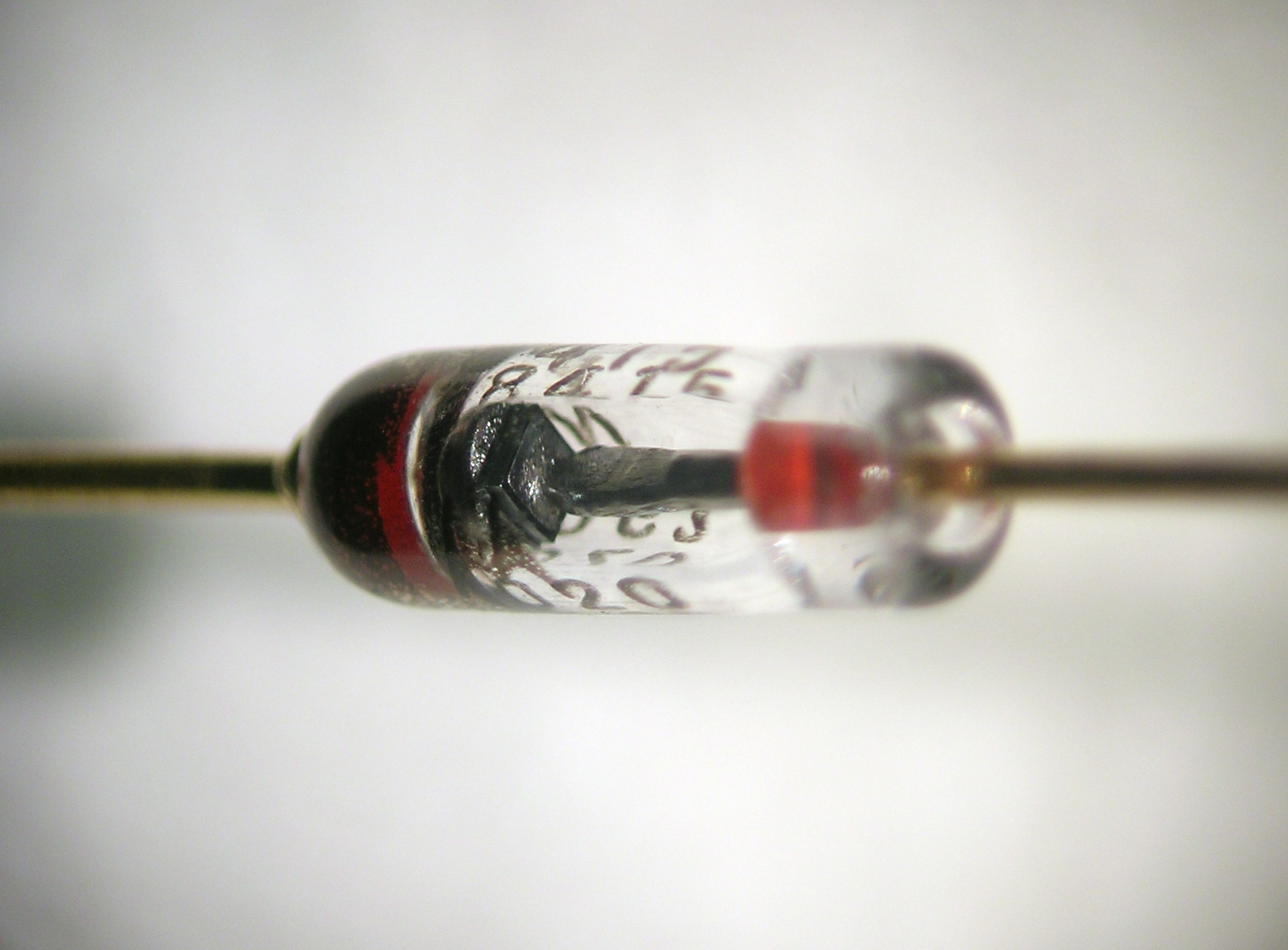
- Close-up view of a silicon diode. The anode is on the right side; the cathode is on the left side (where it is marked with a black band). The square silicon crystal can be seen between the two leads.
- Component type: Active
- Inventor: Jagadish Chandra Bose
- Invention year: 1901
- Pin names: Anode and cathode

Electronic symbol

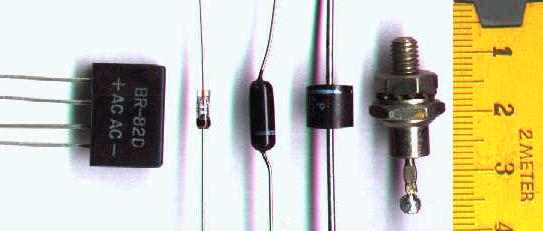
Various semiconductor diodes. Left: A four-diode bridge rectifier. Next to it is a 1N4148 signal diode. On the far right is a Zener diode. In most diodes, a white or black painted band identifies the cathode into which electrons will flow when the diode is conducting. Electron flow is the reverse of conventional current flow.

A diode is a two-terminal electronic component that conducts electric current primarily in one direction (asymmetric conductance). It has low (ideally zero) resistance in one direction and high (ideally infinite) resistance in the other.

A semiconductor diode, the most commonly used type today, is a crystalline piece of semiconductor material with a p–n junction connected to two electrical terminals. It has an exponential current–voltage characteristic. Semiconductor diodes were the first semiconductor electronic devices. The discovery of asymmetric electrical conduction across the contact between a crystalline mineral and a metal was made by German physicist Ferdinand Braun in 1874. Today, most diodes are made of silicon, but other semiconducting materials such as gallium arsenide and germanium are also used.

The obsolete thermionic diode is a vacuum tube with two electrodes, a heated cathode and a plate, in which electrons can flow in only one direction, from the cathode to the plate.

Among many uses, diodes are found in rectifiers to convert alternating current (AC) power to direct current (DC), demodulation in radio receivers, and can be used for logic or as temperature sensors. A common variant of a diode is a light-emitting diode, which is used as electric lighting and status indicators on electronic devices.

== Main functions ==
=== Unidirectional current flow ===
The most common function of a diode is to allow an electric current to pass in one direction (called the diode's forward direction), while blocking it in the opposite direction (the reverse direction). Its hydraulic analog is a check valve. This unidirectional behavior can convert alternating current (AC) to direct current (DC), a process called rectification. As rectifiers, diodes can be used for such tasks as extracting modulation from radio signals in radio receivers.

=== Threshold voltage ===
Forward current–voltage curve of 4 common semiconductor diodes.

Thermionic diode current-voltage curve

A diode's behavior is often simplified as having a forward threshold voltage or turn-on voltage or cut-in voltage, above which there is significant current and below which there is almost no current, which depends on a diode's composition:

Forward threshold voltage for various semiconductor diodes
Diode Type	Forward threshold voltage
Silicon Schottky	0.15 V to 0.45 V
Germanium p–n	0.25 V to 0.3 V
Silicon p–n	0.6 V to 0.7 V
Infrared (GaAs) p–n	~1.2 V
Light-emitting diodes (LEDs)	1.6 V (red) to 4 V (violet). Light-emitting diode physics § Materials has a complete list.

This voltage may loosely be referred to simply as the diode's forward voltage drop or just voltage drop, since a consequence of the steepness of the exponential is that a diode's voltage drop will not significantly exceed the threshold voltage under normal forward bias operating conditions. Datasheets typically quote a typical or maximum forward voltage (V_{F}) for a specified current and temperature (e.g. 20 mA and 25 °C for LEDs), so the user has a guarantee about when a certain amount of current will kick in. At higher currents, the forward voltage drop of the diode increases. For instance, a drop of 1 V to 1.5 V is typical at full rated current for silicon power diodes. (See also: Rectifier § Rectifier voltage drop)

However, a semiconductor diode's exponential current–voltage characteristic is really more gradual than this simple on–off action. Although the graph of the function may appear to have a definite "knee" around this threshold, this is merely reflective of its exponential nature; there is nothing unique about the region that differs from any other parts of the graph (which can be seen by using a semi-log plot, with current being represented on a logarithmic scale and voltage on a linear scale).

Since a diode's forward-voltage drop varies only a little with the current, and is more so a function of temperature, this effect can be used as a temperature sensor or as a somewhat imprecise voltage reference.

=== Reverse breakdown ===
A diode's high resistance to current flowing in the reverse direction suddenly drops to a low resistance when the reverse voltage across the diode reaches a value called the breakdown voltage. This effect is used to regulate voltage (Zener diodes) or to protect circuits from high voltage surges (avalanche diodes).

=== Other functions ===
A semiconductor diode's current–voltage characteristic can be tailored by selecting the semiconductor materials and the doping impurities introduced into the materials during manufacture. These techniques are used to create special-purpose diodes that perform many different functions. For example, to electronically tune radio and TV receivers (varactor diodes), to generate radio-frequency oscillations (tunnel diodes, Gunn diodes, IMPATT diodes), and to produce light (light-emitting diodes). Tunnel, Gunn and IMPATT diodes exhibit negative resistance, which is useful in microwave and switching circuits.

Diodes, both vacuum and semiconductor, can be used as shot-noise generators.

== History ==
Thermionic (vacuum-tube) diodes and solid-state (semiconductor) diodes were developed separately, at approximately the same time, in the early 1900s, as radio receiver detectors. Until the 1950s, vacuum diodes were used more frequently in radios because the early point-contact semiconductor diodes were less stable. In addition, most receiving sets had vacuum tubes for amplification that could easily have the thermionic diodes included in the tube (for example the 12SQ7 double diode triode), and vacuum-tube rectifiers and gas-filled rectifiers were capable of handling some high-voltage/high-current rectification tasks better than the semiconductor diodes (such as selenium rectifiers) that were available at that time.

=== Thermionic ===
Structure of a vacuum tube diode. The filament itself may be the cathode, or more commonly (as shown here) used to heat a separate metal tube which serves as the cathode.

In 1873, Frederick Guthrie observed that a grounded, white-hot metal ball brought close to an electroscope would discharge a positively charged electroscope, but not a negatively charged electroscope. In 1880, Thomas Edison observed unidirectional current between heated and unheated elements in a bulb, later called Edison effect, and was granted a patent on application of the phenomenon for use in a DC voltmeter.

About 20 years later, John Ambrose Fleming (scientific adviser to the Marconi Company and former Edison employee) realized that the Edison effect could be used as a radio detector. Fleming patented the first true thermionic diode, the Fleming valve, in Britain on 16 November 1904 (followed by U.S. patent 803,684 in November 1905). Throughout the vacuum tube era, valve diodes were used in almost all electronics such as radios, televisions, sound systems, and instrumentation. They slowly lost market share beginning in the late 1940s due to selenium rectifier technology and then to semiconductor diodes during the 1960s. Today they are still used in a few high power applications where their ability to withstand transient voltages and their robustness gives them an advantage over semiconductor devices, and in musical instrument and audiophile applications.

=== Semiconductor ===
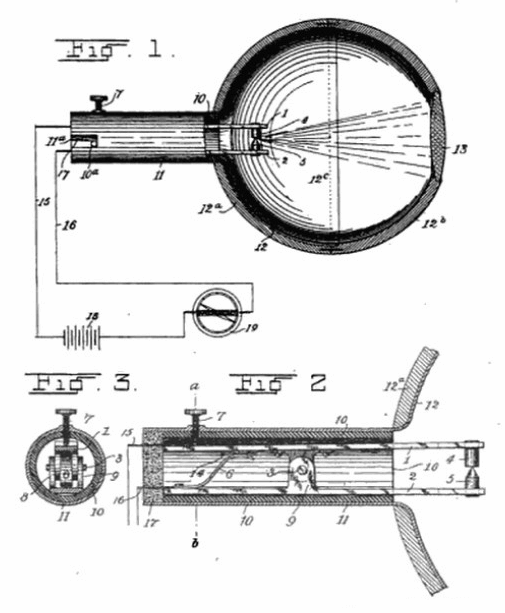
Bose's 1901 patent

In 1874, German scientist Karl Ferdinand Braun discovered the "unilateral conduction" across a contact between a metal and a mineral. C. E. Fitts made a selenium current rectifier c. 1886, but his work did not result in any practical devices until the 1930s. Indian scientist Jagadish Chandra Bose was the first to use a crystal for detecting radio waves in 1894, and he filed a U.S. patent for detecting radio signals with a galena crystal point-contact semiconductor diode in 1901.

The crystal detector was developed into a practical device for wireless telegraphy by Greenleaf Whittier Pickard, who invented a silicon crystal detector in 1903 and received a patent for it on 20 November 1906. He subsequently founded a company to market "cat’s whisker" crystal radio detectors; probably the first to make and sell commercial silicon semiconductor devices. Other experimenters tried a variety of other minerals as detectors (e.g., Henry Dunwoody received a patent using silicon carbide later in 1906 and Wichi Torikata earned a patent in 1908).

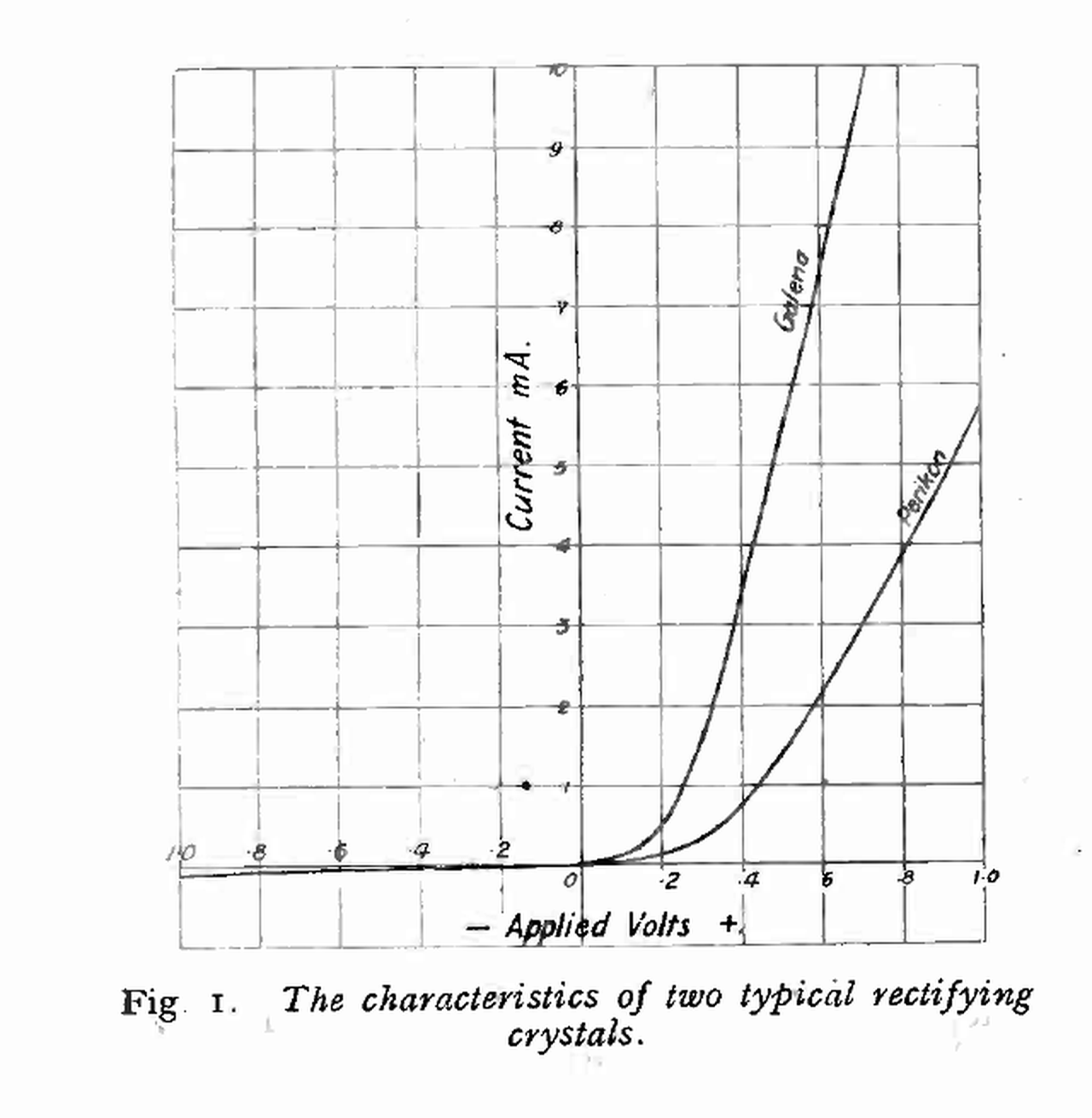
Current–voltage characteristics of galena and perikon crystal rectifiers, illustrating the nonlinear rectifying behavior used in early radio detectors. From 1925 Experimental Wireless article.

Semiconductor principles were unknown to the developers of these early rectifiers. During the 1930s understanding of physics advanced and in the mid-1930s researchers at Bell Telephone Laboratories recognized the potential of the crystal detector for application in microwave technology. Researchers at Bell Labs, Western Electric, MIT, Purdue and in the United Kingdom intensively developed point-contact diodes (crystal rectifiers or crystal diodes) during World War II for application in radar. After World War II, AT&T used these in its microwave towers that criss-crossed the United States, and many radar sets use them even in the 21st century. In 1946, Sylvania began offering the 1N34 crystal diode. During the early 1950s, junction diodes were developed.

== Etymology ==
Early asymmetric conduction devices were commonly referred to as rectifiers because their principal use was the conversion of alternating current to direct current. In 1919, the year tetrodes were introduced, William Henry Eccles coined the term diode from the Greek di (δί), meaning "two", and hodos (ὁδός), meaning "path". The term described a vacuum tube having two electrodes.

In modern usage the term diode refers generally to a two-terminal device that exhibits asymmetric conduction. The term rectifier is often used more specifically for devices intended for power supply conversion, while diode is frequently used for small-signal devices such as detectors or switching elements.

A similar distinction existed with thermionic devices: small vacuum diodes were commonly used as radio detectors, while larger two-electrode valves designed for power conversion were typically referred to as rectifier valves or rectifiers.

== Vacuum tube diodes ==
Thermionic diode
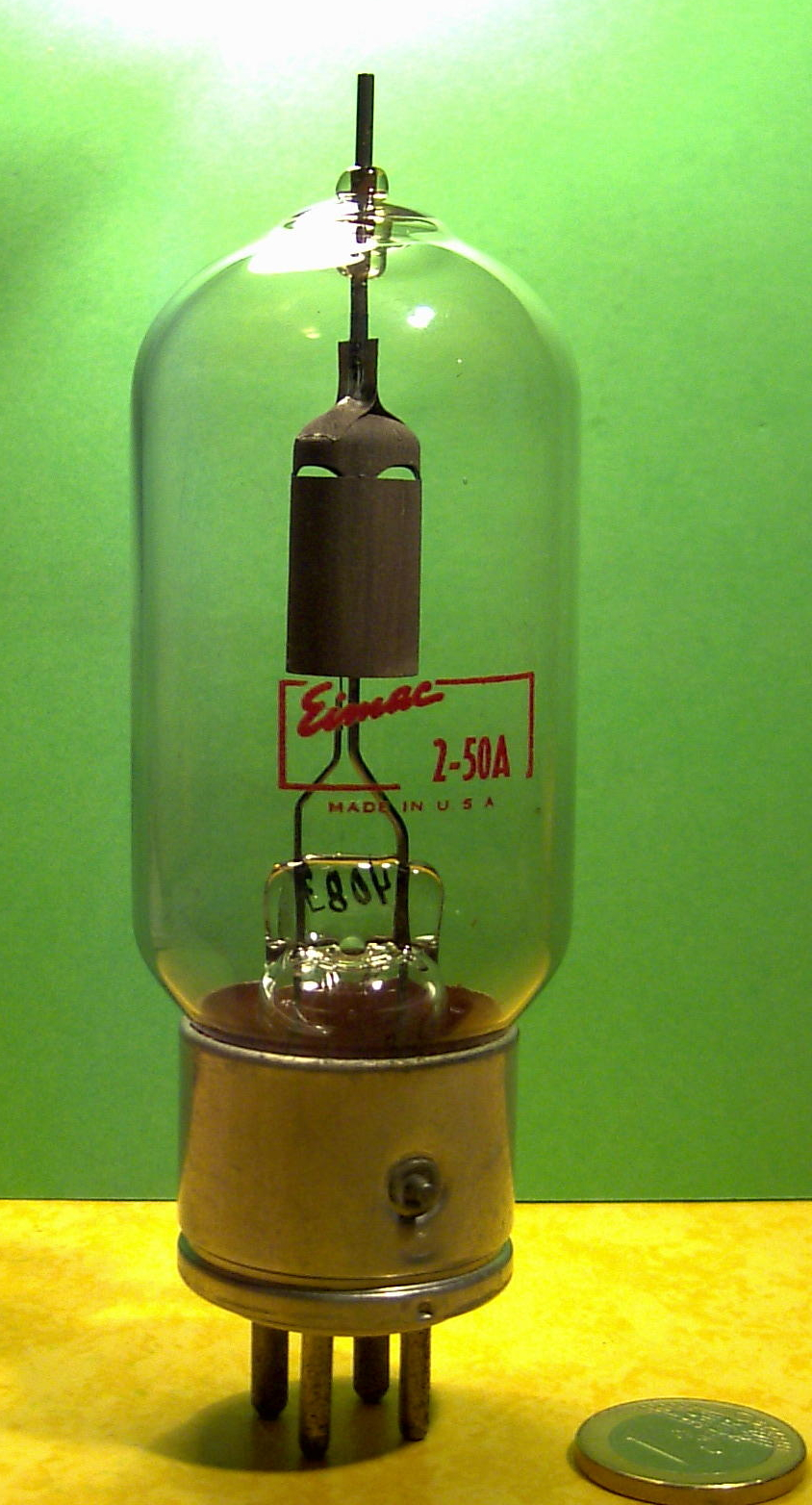
- A high power vacuum tube diode used in radio equipment as a rectifier
- Component type: Active
- Working principle: Thermionic emission
- Inventor: John Ambrose Fleming
- Invention year: 1904
- Pin names: Plate and cathode

Electronic symbol
- The symbol for an indirectly heated vacuum tube diode. From top to bottom, the element names are: plate, cathode, and heater.

A thermionic diode is a vacuum tube consisting of a sealed, evacuated glass or metal envelope containing two electrodes: a cathode and a plate. The cathode is either indirectly heated or directly heated. If indirect heating is employed, a heater is included in the envelope.

In operation, the cathode is heated to red heat, around 800–1,000 °C (1,470–1,830 °F). A directly heated cathode is made of tungsten wire and is heated by a current passed through it from an external voltage source. An indirectly heated cathode is heated by infrared radiation from a nearby heater that is formed of nichrome wire and supplied with current provided by an external voltage source.

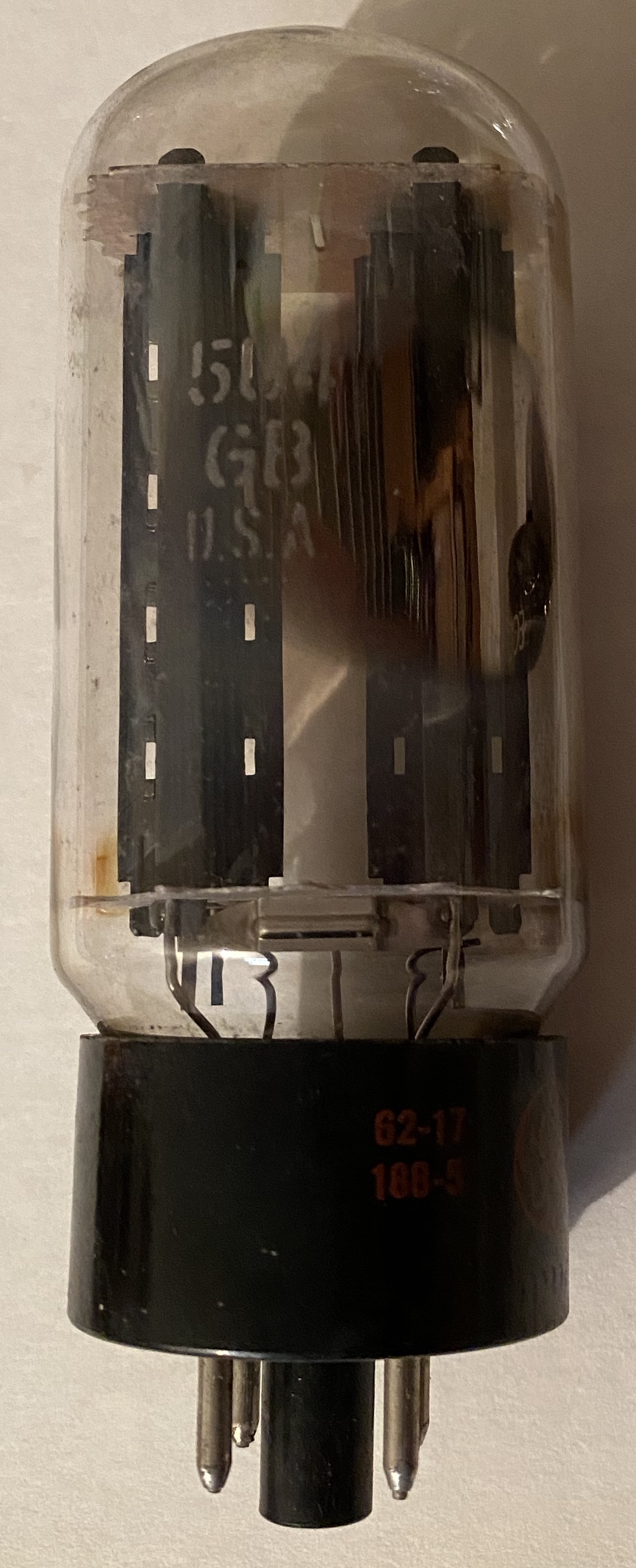
A vacuum tube containing two power diodes

The operating temperature of the cathode causes it to emit electrons into the vacuum by thermionic emission. In most receiving tubes the cathode is coated with oxides of alkaline-earth metals, typically barium and strontium oxides, which possess a low work function and therefore emit electrons more readily than bare metal surfaces.

The plate is not heated and does not normally emit electrons; it serves as the electron-collecting electrode.

When an alternating voltage is applied between cathode and plate, the diode conducts only when the plate is positive with respect to the cathode. In that condition the plate electrostatically attracts electrons emitted by the cathode, and current flows from cathode to plate. When the plate is negative with respect to the cathode, it does not emit electrons and the electron stream from the cathode is repelled, so no conduction occurs.

Under typical operating conditions, the diode current is limited not by emission but by the space charge formed by electrons in transit between cathode and plate. In this region the current density follows the Child–Langmuir law, varying approximately as the three-halves power of the plate voltage (Ip ∝ Ep^(3/2)) for fixed electrode spacing.

Other types of diodes include the mercury vapor diode, the xenon gas diode, the cold-cathode rectifier, and the magnetron.

== Semiconductor diodes ==
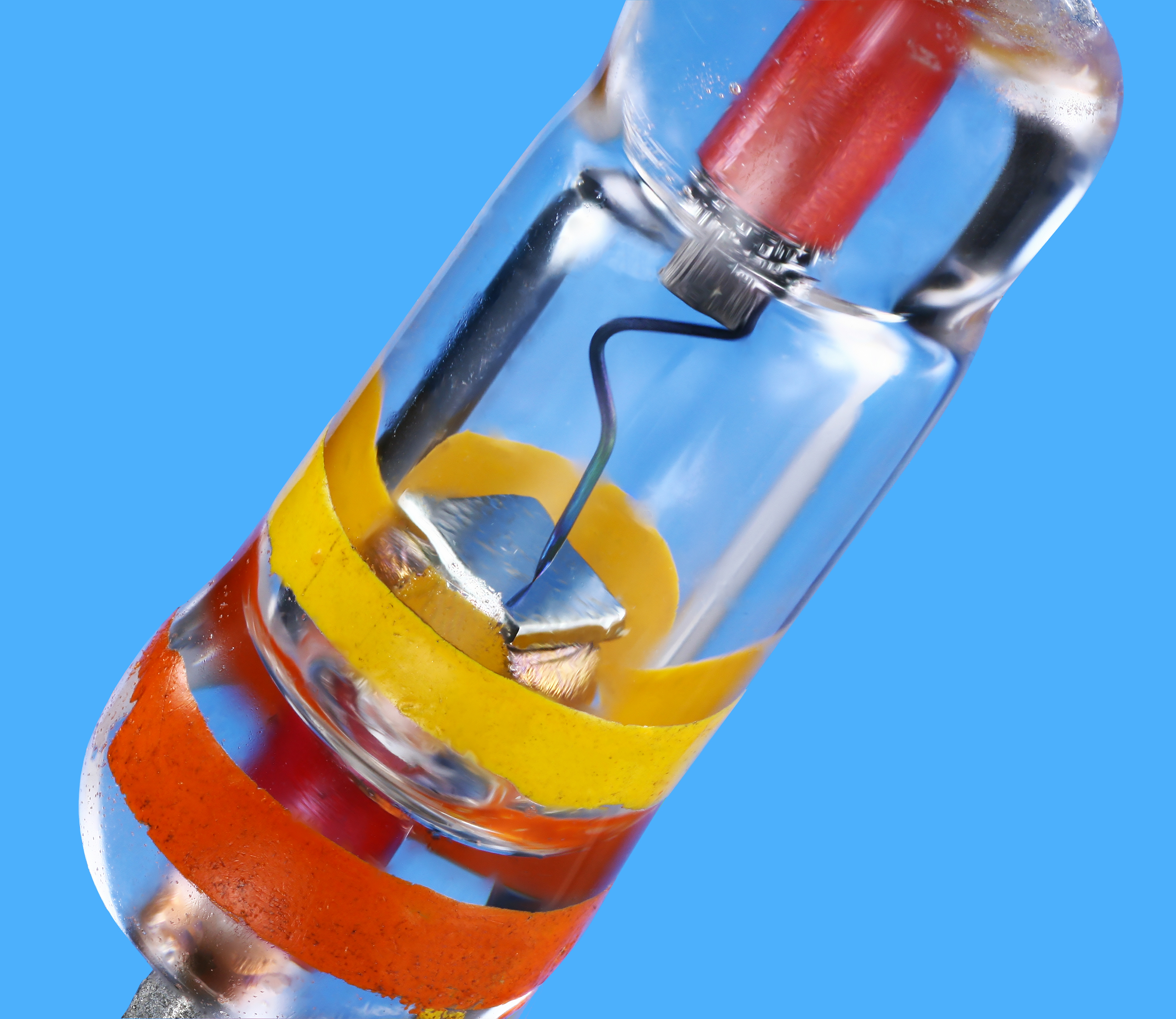
Close-up of an EFD108 germanium point-contact diode in DO7 glass package, showing the sharp metal wire (cat whisker) that forms the semiconductor junction.

=== Point-contact diodes ===
Until about the end of the 1950s diodes that relied on a small diameter metal wire point contact, e. g. tungsten wire, to make contact with a small semiconductor crystal were all called "crystal detectors". The contact could be a non-welded contact type or a welded contact type. Non-welded contact construction utilizes the Schottky barrier principle. The metal side is the pointed end of a small diameter wire that is in contact with the semiconductor crystal. In the welded contact type, a small P region is formed in the otherwise N-type crystal around the metal point during manufacture by momentarily passing a relatively large current through the device.

With the availibility of vacuum tube diodes for receiver, crystal detectors were mainly used for research and development between 1925 until 1940. The need for demodulator for radar applications and test equipment in the microwave bands up to 26 GHz led to the use of Silicon for a crystal detector by Bell Laboratories with production starting in 1942. Those crystal detectors had a ceramic case and needed manual adjustment of the point contact during production. For the typical radar bands at the time 1N25 (<1 GHz), 1N21 (<3 GHz) and later 1N21WE (<12 G.4 GHz), 1N23 (<9,4 GHz) and 1N26 (<24 GHz) were available

In February 1946 Silvania Electric introduced a crystal detector that used Germanium instead of Silicon. The first models used also a ceramic case, e.g. 1N34 while the later model 1N34A had a case made out of glass. Unlike the Silicon type crystal detectors the 1N34 diode allowed also use as rectifiers for small currents. Silvania Electric, called their diodes initially also "crystal detectors", later in July 1946 changed it to "crystal diode" and in November 1947 in data sheets to "Germanium crystal Diodes"

=== Junction diodes ===
==== p–n junction diode ====
A p–n junction diode is made of a crystal of semiconductor, usually silicon, but germanium and gallium arsenide are also used. Impurities are added to it to create a region on one side that contains negative charge carriers (electrons), called an n-type semiconductor, and a region on the other side that contains positive charge carriers (holes), called a p-type semiconductor. When the n-type and p-type materials are attached together, a momentary flow of electrons occurs from the n to the p side resulting in a third region between the two where no charge carriers are present. This region is called the depletion region because there are no charge carriers (neither electrons nor holes) in it. The diode's terminals are attached to the n-type and p-type regions. The boundary between these two regions, called a p–n junction, is where the action of the diode takes place. When a sufficiently higher electrical potential is applied to the P side (the anode) than to the N side (the cathode), it allows electrons to flow through the depletion region from the N-type side to the P-type side. The junction does not allow the flow of electrons in the opposite direction when the potential is applied in reverse, creating, in a sense, an electrical check valve.

==== Schottky diode ====
Another type of junction diode, the Schottky diode, is formed from a metal–semiconductor junction rather than a p–n junction, which reduces capacitance and increases switching speed.

=== Current–voltage characteristic ===
A semiconductor diode's behavior in a circuit is given by its current–voltage characteristic. The shape of the curve is determined by the transport of charge carriers through the so-called depletion layer or depletion region that exists at the p–n junction between differing semiconductors. When a p–n junction is first created, conduction-band (mobile) electrons from the N-doped region diffuse into the P-doped region where there is a large population of holes (vacant places for electrons) with which the electrons "recombine". When a mobile electron recombines with a hole, both hole and electron vanish, leaving behind an immobile positively charged donor (dopant) on the N side and negatively charged acceptor (dopant) on the P side. The region around the p–n junction becomes depleted of charge carriers and thus behaves as an insulator.

However, the width of the depletion region (called the depletion width) cannot grow without limit. For each electron–hole pair recombination made, a positively charged dopant ion is left behind in the N-doped region, and a negatively charged dopant ion is created in the P-doped region. As recombination proceeds and more ions are created, an increasing electric field develops through the depletion zone that acts to slow and then finally stop recombination. At this point, there is a "built-in" potential across the depletion zone.

A p–n junction diode in low forward bias mode. The depletion width decreases as voltage increases. Both p and n junctions are doped at a 1e15/cm3 doping level, leading to built-in potential of ~0.59V. Observe the different quasi Fermi levels for conduction band and valence band in n and p regions (red curves).

==== Reverse bias ====
If an external voltage is placed across the diode with the same polarity as the built-in potential, the depletion zone continues to act as an insulator, preventing any significant electric current flow (unless electron–hole pairs are actively being created in the junction by, for instance, light; see photodiode).

==== Forward bias ====
However, if the polarity of the external voltage opposes the built-in potential, recombination can once again proceed, resulting in a substantial electric current through the p–n junction (i.e. substantial numbers of electrons and holes recombine at the junction) that increases exponentially with voltage.

==== Operating regions ====
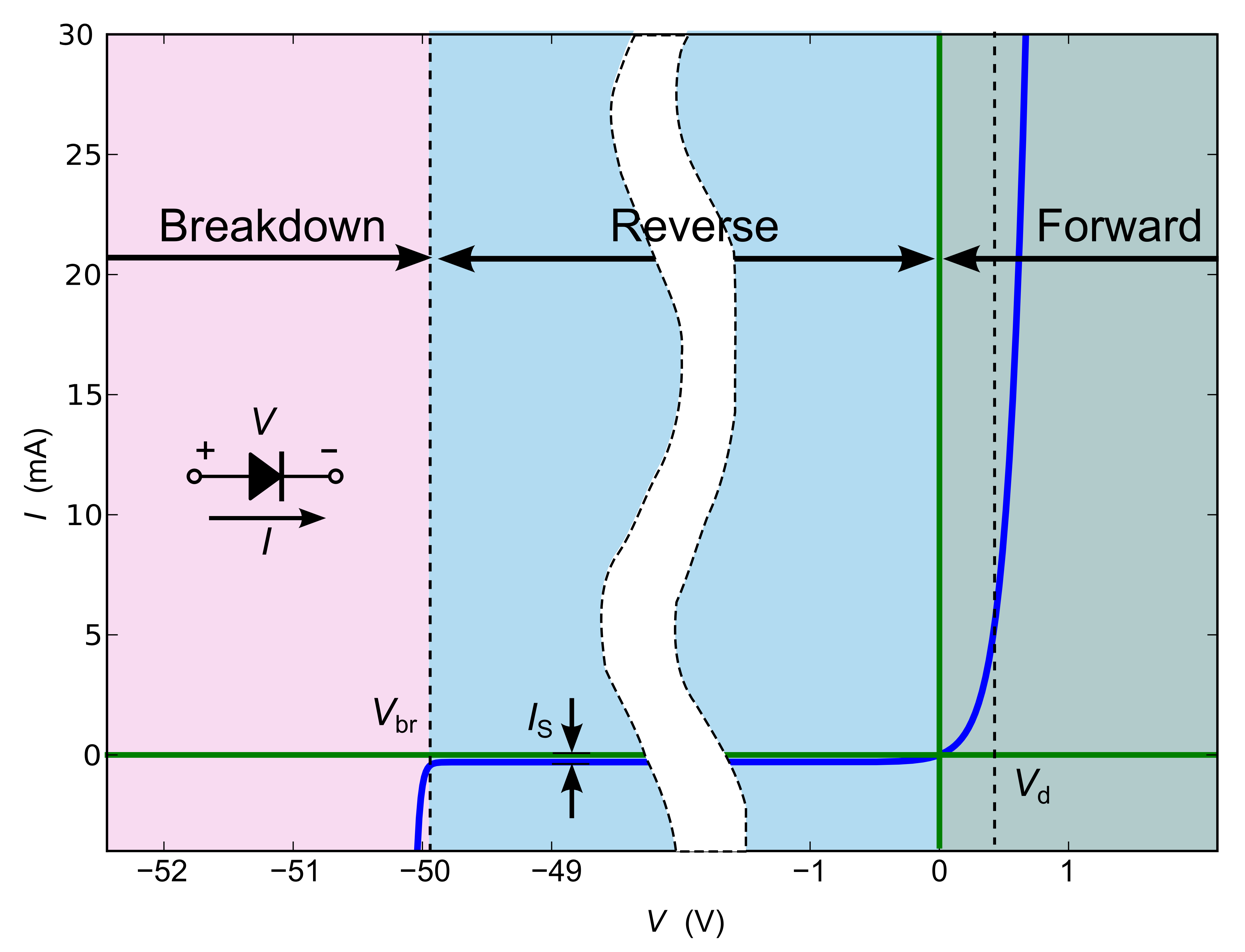
Current–voltage characteristic of a p–n junction diode showing three regions: breakdown, reverse biased, forward biased. The exponential's "knee" is at V_{d}. The leveling off region which occurs at larger forward currents is not shown.

A diode's current–voltage characteristic can be approximated by four operating regions. From lower to higher bias voltages, these are:

- Breakdown: At very large reverse bias, beyond the peak inverse voltage (PIV), a process called reverse breakdown occurs that causes a large increase in current (i.e., a large number of electrons and holes are created at, and move away from the p–n junction) that usually damages the device permanently. The avalanche diode is deliberately designed for use in that manner. In the Zener diode, the concept of PIV is not applicable. A Zener diode contains a heavily doped p–n junction allowing electrons to tunnel from the valence band of the p-type material to the conduction band of the n-type material, such that the reverse voltage is "clamped" to a known value (called the Zener voltage), and avalanche does not occur. Both devices, however, do have a limit to the maximum current and power they can withstand in the clamped reverse-voltage region. Also, following the end of forwarding conduction in any diode, there is reverse current for a short time. The device does not attain its full blocking capability until the reverse current ceases.
- Reverse biased: For a bias between breakdown and 0 V, the reverse current is very small and asymptotically approaches -I_{s}. For a normal P–N rectifier diode, the reverse current through the device is in the micro-ampere (μA) range. However, this is temperature dependent, and at sufficiently high temperatures, a substantial amount of reverse current can be observed (mA or more). There is also a tiny surface leakage current caused by electrons simply going around the diode as though it were an imperfect insulator.
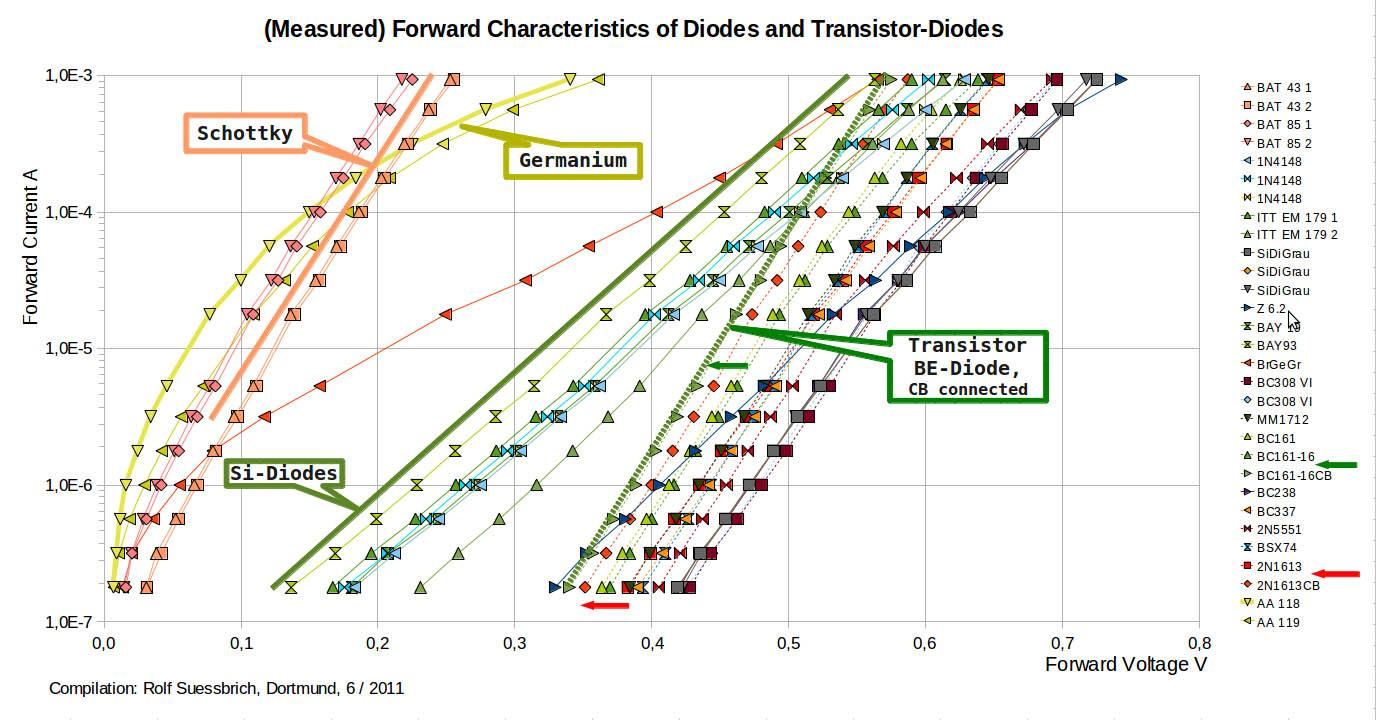
  Semi-log I–V (logarithmic current vs. linear voltage) graph of various diodes.
- Forward biased: The current–voltage curve is exponential, approximating the Shockley diode equation. When plotted using a linear current scale, a smooth "knee" appears, but no clear threshold voltage is visible on a semi-log graph.
- Leveling off: At larger forward currents the current–voltage curve starts to be dominated by the ohmic resistance of the bulk semiconductor. The curve is no longer exponential, it is asymptotic to a straight line whose slope is the bulk resistance. This region is particularly important for power diodes and can be modeled by a Shockley ideal diode in series with a fixed resistor.

=== Shockley diode equation ===
The Shockley ideal diode equation or the diode law (named after the bipolar junction transistor co-inventor William Bradford Shockley) models the exponential current–voltage (I–V) relationship of diodes in moderate forward or reverse bias. The article Shockley diode equation provides details.

=== Small-signal behavior ===
At forward voltages less than the saturation voltage, the voltage versus current characteristic curve of most diodes is not a straight line. The current can be approximated by $I = I_\text{S} e^{V_\text{D}/(n V_\text{T})}$ as explained in the Shockley diode equation article.

In detector and mixer applications, the current can be estimated by a Taylor's series. The odd terms can be omitted because they produce frequency components that are outside the pass band of the mixer or detector. Even terms beyond the second derivative usually need not be included because they are small compared to the second order term. The desired current component is approximately proportional to the square of the input voltage, so the response is called square law in this region.

=== Reverse-recovery effect ===
Following the end of forwarding conduction in a p–n type diode, a reverse current can flow for a short time. The device does not attain its blocking capability until the mobile charge in the junction is depleted.

The effect can be significant when switching large currents very quickly. A certain amount of "reverse recovery time" t_{r} (on the order of tens of nanoseconds to a few microseconds) may be required to remove the reverse recovery charge Q_{r} from the diode. During this recovery time, the diode can conduct in the reverse direction. This might give rise to a large current in the reverse direction for a short time while the diode is reverse biased. The magnitude of such a reverse current is determined by the operating circuit (i.e., the series resistance) and the diode is said to be in the storage-phase. In certain real-world cases it is important to consider the losses that are incurred by this non-ideal diode effect. However, when the slew rate of the current is not so severe (e.g. Line frequency) the effect can be safely ignored. For most applications, the effect is also negligible for Schottky diodes.

The reverse current ceases abruptly when the stored charge is depleted; this abrupt stop is exploited in step recovery diodes for the generation of extremely short pulses.

=== Types of semiconductor diode ===
Current–voltage curves of several types of diodes

Normal (p–n) diodes, which operate as described above, are usually made of doped silicon or germanium. Before the development of silicon power rectifier diodes, cuprous oxide and later selenium was used. Their low efficiency required a much higher forward voltage to be applied (typically 1.4 to 1.7 V per "cell", with multiple cells stacked so as to increase the peak inverse voltage rating for application in high voltage rectifiers), and required a large heat sink (often an extension of the diode's metal substrate), much larger than the later silicon diode of the same current ratings would require. The vast majority of all diodes are the p–n diodes found in CMOS integrated circuits, which include two diodes per pin and many other internal diodes.

Avalanche diodes
These are diodes that conduct in the reverse direction when the reverse bias voltage exceeds the breakdown voltage. These are electrically very similar to Zener diodes (and are often mistakenly called Zener diodes), but break down by a different mechanism: the avalanche effect. This occurs when the reverse electric field applied across the p–n junction causes a wave of ionization, reminiscent of an avalanche, leading to a large current. Avalanche diodes are designed to break down at a well-defined reverse voltage without being destroyed. The difference between the avalanche diode (which has a reverse breakdown above about 6.2 V) and the Zener is that the channel length of the former exceeds the mean free path of the electrons, resulting in many collisions between them on the way through the channel. The only practical difference between the two types is they have temperature coefficients of opposite polarities.
Constant-current diodes
These are actually JFETs with the gate shorted to the source, and function like a two-terminal current-limiting analog to the voltage-limiting Zener diode. They allow a current through them to rise to a certain value, and then level off at a specific value. Also called CLDs, constant-current diodes, diode-connected transistors, or current-regulating diodes.
Crystal rectifiers or crystal diodes
These are point-contact diodes. The 1N21 series and others are used in mixer and detector applications in radar and microwave receivers. The 1N34A is another example of a crystal diode.
Gunn diodes
These are similar to tunnel diodes in that they are made of materials such as GaAs or InP that exhibit a region of negative differential resistance. With appropriate biasing, dipole domains form and travel across the diode, allowing high frequency microwave oscillators to be built.
Light-emitting diodes (LEDs)
In a diode formed from a direct band-gap semiconductor, such as gallium arsenide, charge carriers that cross the junction emit photons when they recombine with the majority carrier on the other side. Depending on the material, wavelengths (or colors) from the infrared to the near ultraviolet may be produced. The first LEDs were red and yellow, and higher-frequency diodes have been developed over time. All LEDs produce incoherent, narrow-spectrum light; "white" LEDs are actually a blue LED with a yellow scintillator coating, or combinations of three LEDs of a different color. LEDs can also be used as low-efficiency photodiodes in signal applications. An LED may be paired with a photodiode or phototransistor in the same package, to form an opto-isolator.
Laser diodes
When an LED-like structure is contained in a resonant cavity formed by polishing the parallel end faces, a laser can be formed. Laser diodes are commonly used in optical storage devices and for high speed optical communication.
Thermal diodes
This term is used both for conventional p–n diodes used to monitor temperature because of their varying forward voltage with temperature, and for Peltier heat pumps for thermoelectric heating and cooling. Peltier heat pumps may be made from semiconductors, though they do not have any rectifying junctions, they use the differing behavior of charge carriers in N and P-type semiconductor to move heat.
Photodiodes
All semiconductors are subject to optical charge carrier generation. This is typically an undesired effect, so most semiconductors are packaged in light-blocking material. Photodiodes are intended to sense light (photodetector), so they are packaged in materials that allow light to pass, and are usually PIN (the kind of diode most sensitive to light). A photodiode can be used in solar cells, in photometry, or in optical communications. Multiple photodiodes may be packaged in a single device, either as a linear array or as a two-dimensional array. These arrays should not be confused with charge-coupled devices.
PIN diodes
A PIN diode has a central un-doped, or intrinsic, layer, forming a p-type/intrinsic/n-type structure. They are used as radio frequency switches and attenuators. They are also used as large-volume, ionizing-radiation detectors and as photodetectors. PIN diodes are also used in power electronics, as their central layer can withstand high voltages. Furthermore, the PIN structure can be found in many power semiconductor devices, such as IGBTs, power MOSFETs, and thyristors.
Schottky diodes
Schottky diodes are constructed from metal to semiconductor contact. They have a lower forward voltage drop than p–n junction diodes. Their forward voltage drop at forward currents of about 1 mA is in the range 0.15 V to 0.45 V, which makes them useful in voltage clamping applications and prevention of transistor saturation. They can also be used as low loss rectifiers, although their reverse leakage current is in general higher than that of other diodes. Schottky diodes are majority carrier devices and so do not suffer from minority carrier storage problems that slow down many other diodes—so they have a faster reverse recovery than p–n junction diodes. They also tend to have much lower junction capacitance than p–n diodes, which provides for high switching speeds and their use in high-speed circuitry and RF devices such as switched-mode power supply, mixers, and detectors.
Super barrier diodes
Super barrier diodes are rectifier diodes that incorporate the low forward voltage drop of the Schottky diode with the surge-handling capability and low reverse leakage current of a normal p–n junction diode.
Gold-doped diodes
As a dopant, gold (or platinum) acts as recombination centers, which helps the fast recombination of minority carriers. This allows the diode to operate at higher signal frequencies, at the expense of a higher forward voltage drop. Gold-doped diodes are faster than other p–n diodes (but not as fast as Schottky diodes). They also have less reverse-current leakage than Schottky diodes (but not as good as other p–n diodes). A typical example is the 1N914.
Snap-off or step recovery diodes
The term step recovery relates to the form of the reverse recovery characteristic of these devices. After a forward current has been passing in an SRD and the current is interrupted or reversed, the reverse conduction will cease very abruptly (as in a step waveform). SRDs can, therefore, provide very fast voltage transitions by the very sudden disappearance of the charge carriers.
Stabistors or forward reference diodes
The term stabistor refers to a special type of diodes featuring extremely stable forward voltage characteristics. These devices are specially designed for low-voltage stabilization applications requiring a guaranteed voltage over a wide current range and highly stable over temperature.
Transient voltage suppression diode (TVS)
These are avalanche diodes designed specifically to protect other semiconductor devices from high-voltage transients. Their p–n junctions have a much larger cross-sectional area than those of a normal diode, allowing them to conduct large currents to ground without sustaining damage.
Tunnel diodes or Esaki diodes
These have a region of operation showing negative resistance caused by quantum tunneling, allowing amplification of signals and very simple bistable circuits. Because of the high carrier concentration, tunnel diodes are very fast, may be used at low (mK) temperatures, high magnetic fields, and in high radiation environments. Because of these properties, they are often used in spacecraft.
Varicap or varactor diodes
These are used as voltage-controlled capacitors. These are important in PLL (phase-locked loop) and FLL (frequency-locked loop) circuits, allowing tuning circuits, such as those in television receivers, to lock quickly on to the frequency. They also enabled tunable oscillators in the early discrete tuning of radios, where a cheap and stable, but fixed-frequency, crystal oscillator provided the reference frequency for a voltage-controlled oscillator.
Zener diodes
These can be made to conduct in reverse bias (backward), and are correctly termed reverse breakdown diodes. This effect called Zener breakdown, occurs at a precisely defined voltage, allowing the diode to be used as a precision voltage reference. The term Zener diodes is colloquially applied to several types of breakdown diodes, but strictly speaking, Zener diodes have a breakdown voltage of below 5 volts, whilst avalanche diodes are used for breakdown voltages above that value. In practical voltage reference circuits, Zener and switching diodes are connected in series and opposite directions to balance the temperature coefficient response of the diodes to near-zero. Some devices labeled as high-voltage Zener diodes are actually avalanche diodes (see above). Two (equivalent) Zeners in series and in reverse order, in the same package, constitute a transient absorber (or Transorb, a registered trademark).

=== Graphic symbols ===
The symbol used to represent a particular type of diode in a circuit diagram conveys the general electrical function to the reader. There are alternative symbols for some types of diodes, though the differences are minor. The triangle in the symbols points to the forward direction, i.e. in the direction of conventional current flow.

Diode

Light-emitting diode (LED)

Photodiode

Schottky diode

Transient-voltage-suppression diode (TVS)

Tunnel diode

Varicap

Zener diode

Typical diode packages in same alignment as diode symbol. The thin bar depicts the cathode.

=== Numbering and coding schemes ===
There are a number of common, standard and manufacturer-driven numbering and coding schemes for diodes; the two most common being the EIA/JEDEC standard and the European Pro Electron standard:

==== EIA/JEDEC ====
The standardized 1N-series numbering EIA370 system was introduced in the US by EIA/JEDEC (Joint Electron Device Engineering Council) about 1960. Most diodes have a 1-prefix designation (e.g., 1N4003). Among the most popular in this series were: 1N34A/1N270 (germanium signal), 1N914/1N4148 (silicon signal), 1N400x (silicon 1A power rectifier), and 1N580x (silicon 3A power rectifier).

==== JIS ====
The JIS semiconductor designation system has all semiconductor diode designations starting with "1S".

==== Pro Electron ====
The European Pro Electron coding system for active components was introduced in 1966 and comprises two letters followed by the part code. The first letter represents the semiconductor material used for the component (A = germanium and B = silicon) and the second letter represents the general function of the part (for diodes, A = low-power/signal, B = variable capacitance, X = multiplier, Y = rectifier and Z = voltage reference); for example:

- AA-series germanium low-power/signal diodes (e.g., AA119)
- BA-series silicon low-power/signal diodes (e.g., BAT18 silicon RF switching diode)
- BY-series silicon rectifier diodes (e.g., BY127 1250V, 1A rectifier diode)
- BZ-series silicon Zener diodes (e.g., BZY88C4V7 4.7V Zener diode)

Other common numbering/coding systems (generally manufacturer-driven) include:

- GD-series germanium diodes (e.g., GD9) – this is a very old coding system
- OA-series germanium diodes (e.g., OA47) – a coding sequence developed by Mullard, a UK company

== Related devices ==
- Rectifier
- Transistor
- Thyristor or silicon controlled rectifier (SCR)
- TRIAC
- DIAC
- Varistor

In optics, an equivalent device for the diode but with laser light would be the optical isolator, also known as an optical diode, that allows light to only pass in one direction. It uses a Faraday rotator as the main component.

== Applications ==
=== Radio demodulation ===
A simple envelope demodulator circuit

The first use for the diode was the demodulation of amplitude modulated (AM) radio broadcasts. An AM signal consists of alternating positive and negative peaks of a radio carrier wave, whose amplitude or envelope is proportional to the original audio signal. The diode rectifies the AM radio frequency signal, leaving only the positive peaks of the carrier wave. The audio is then extracted from the rectified carrier wave using a simple filter and fed into an audio amplifier or transducer, which generates sound waves via audio speaker.

In microwave and millimeter wave technology, beginning in the 1930s, researchers improved and miniaturized the crystal detector. Point contact diodes (crystal diodes) and Schottky diodes are used in radar, microwave and millimeter wave detectors.

=== Power conversion ===
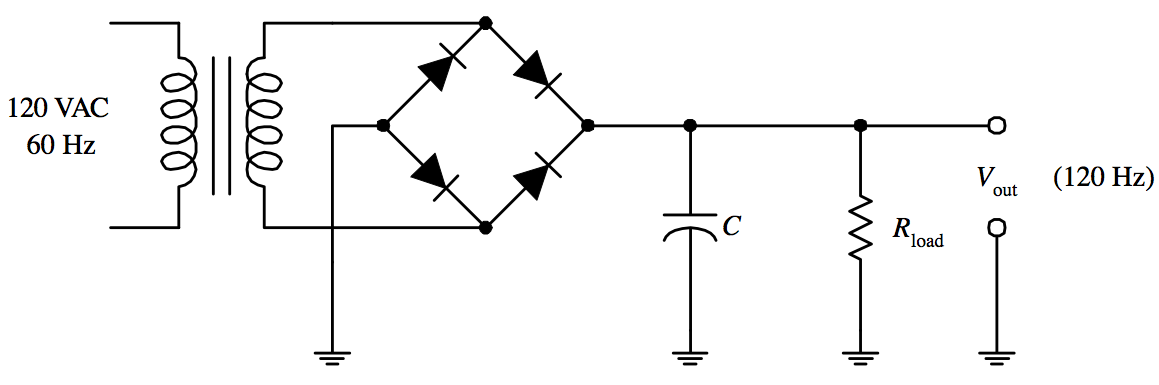
Schematic of basic AC-to-DC power supply

Rectifiers are constructed from diodes, where they are used to convert alternating current (AC) electricity into direct current (DC). Automotive alternators are a common example, where the diode, which rectifies the AC into DC, provides better performance than the commutator or earlier, dynamo. Similarly, diodes are also used in Cockcroft–Walton voltage multipliers to convert AC into higher DC voltages.

=== Reverse-voltage protection ===
Since most electronic circuits can be damaged when the polarity of their power supply inputs are reversed, a series diode is sometimes used to protect against such situations. This concept is known by multiple naming variations that mean the same thing: reverse voltage protection, reverse polarity protection, and reverse battery protection.

=== Over-voltage protection ===
Diodes are frequently used to conduct damaging high voltages away from sensitive electronic devices. They are usually reverse-biased (non-conducting) under normal circumstances. When the voltage rises above the normal range, the diodes become forward-biased (conducting). For example, diodes are used in (stepper motor and H-bridge) motor controller and relay circuits to de-energize coils rapidly without the damaging voltage spikes that would otherwise occur. (A diode used in such an application is called a flyback diode). Many integrated circuits also incorporate diodes on the connection pins to prevent external voltages from damaging their sensitive transistors. Specialized diodes are used to protect from over-voltages at higher power (see Diode types above).

=== Logic gates ===
Diode–resistor logic constructs AND and OR logic gates. Functional completeness can be achieved by adding an active device to provide inversion (as done with diode–transistor logic).

=== Ionizing radiation detectors ===
In addition to light, mentioned above, semiconductor diodes are sensitive to more energetic radiation. In electronics, cosmic rays and other sources of ionizing radiation cause noise pulses and single and multiple bit errors. This effect is sometimes exploited by particle detectors to detect radiation. A single particle of radiation, with thousands or millions of electron volt, s of energy, generates many charge carrier pairs, as its energy is deposited in the semiconductor material. If the depletion layer is large enough to catch the whole shower or to stop a heavy particle, a fairly accurate measurement of the particle's energy can be made, simply by measuring the charge conducted and without the complexity of a magnetic spectrometer, etc. These semiconductor radiation detectors need efficient and uniform charge collection and low leakage current. They are often cooled by liquid nitrogen. For longer-range (about a centimeter) particles, they need a very large depletion depth and large area. For short-range particles, they need any contact or un-depleted semiconductor on at least one surface to be very thin. The back-bias voltages are near breakdown (around a thousand volts per centimeter). Germanium and silicon are common materials. Some of these detectors sense position as well as energy. They have a finite life, especially when detecting heavy particles, because of radiation damage. Silicon and germanium are quite different in their ability to convert gamma rays to electron showers.

Semiconductor detectors for high-energy particles are used in large numbers. Because of energy loss fluctuations, accurate measurement of the energy deposited is of less use.

=== Temperature measurements ===
A diode can be used as a temperature measuring device, since the forward voltage drop across the diode depends on temperature, as in a silicon bandgap temperature sensor. From the Shockley ideal diode equation given above, it might appear that the voltage has a positive temperature coefficient (at a constant current), but usually the variation of the reverse saturation current term is more significant than the variation in the thermal voltage term. Most diodes therefore have a negative temperature coefficient, typically −2 mV/°C for silicon diodes. The temperature coefficient is approximately constant for temperatures above about 20 kelvin. Some graphs are given for 1N400x series, and CY7 cryogenic temperature sensor.

=== Current steering ===
Diodes will prevent currents in unintended directions. To supply power to an electrical circuit during a power failure, the circuit can draw current from a battery. An uninterruptible power supply may use diodes in this way to ensure that the current is only drawn from the battery when necessary. Likewise, small boats typically have two circuits each with their own battery/batteries: one used for engine starting; one used for domestics. Normally, both are charged from a single alternator, and a heavy-duty split-charge diode is used to prevent the higher-charge battery (typically the engine battery) from discharging through the lower-charge battery when the alternator is not running.

Diodes are also used in electronic musical keyboards. To reduce the amount of wiring needed in electronic musical keyboards, these instruments often use keyboard matrix circuits. The keyboard controller scans the rows and columns to determine which note the player has pressed. The problem with matrix circuits is that, when several notes are pressed at once, the current can flow backward through the circuit and trigger "phantom keys" that cause "ghost" notes to play. To avoid triggering unwanted notes, most keyboard matrix circuits have diodes soldered with the switch under each key of the musical keyboard. The same principle is also used for the switch matrix in solid-state pinball machines.

=== Waveform clipper ===
Diodes can be used to limit the positive or negative excursion of a signal to a prescribed voltage.

=== Clamper ===
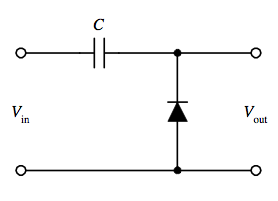
This simple diode clamp will clamp the negative peaks of the incoming waveform to the common rail voltage

A diode clamp circuit can take a periodic alternating current signal that oscillates between positive and negative values, and vertically displace it such that either the positive or the negative peaks occur at a prescribed level. The clamper does not restrict the peak-to-peak excursion of the signal, it moves the whole signal up or down so as to place the peaks at the reference level.

=== Computing exponentials and logarithms ===
The diode's exponential current–voltage relationship is exploited to evaluate exponentiation and its inverse function the logarithm using analog voltage signals (see Operational amplifier applications §§ Exponential output and Logarithmic output).

== Abbreviations ==
Diodes are usually referred to as D for diode on PCBs. Sometimes the abbreviation CR for crystal rectifier is used.

== See also ==
- Active rectification
- Diode-connected transistor
- Diode modelling
- Fast/ultrafast diode
- Flame rectification
- Lambda diode
- Lr-diode
- p–n junction
- Small-signal model
