= Clipper (electronics) =

Protective electronic circuit

Voltage clipping limits the voltage to a device without affecting the rest of the waveform

In electronics, a clipper is a circuit designed to prevent a signal from exceeding a predetermined reference voltage level. A clipper does not distort the remaining part of the applied waveform. Clipping circuits are used to select, for purposes of transmission, that part of a signal waveform which lies above or below the predetermined reference voltage level.

Clipping may be achieved either at one level or two levels. A clipper circuit can remove certain portions of an arbitrary waveform near the positive or negative peaks or both. Clipping changes the shape of the waveform and alters its spectral components.

A clipping circuit consists of linear elements like resistors and non-linear elements like diodes or transistors, but it does not contain energy-storage elements like capacitors.

Clipping circuits are also called slicers or amplitude selectors.

== Types ==
=== Diode clipper ===
Positive peak clipper circuit

A simple diode clipper can be made with a diode and a resistor. This will remove either the positive, or the negative half of the waveform depending on the direction the diode is connected. The simple circuit clips at zero voltage (or to be more precise, at the small forward voltage of the forward biased diode) but the clipping voltage can be set to any desired value with the addition of a reference voltage. The diagram illustrates a positive reference voltage but the reference can be positive or negative for both positive and negative clipping giving four possible configurations in all.

The simplest circuit for the voltage reference is a resistor potential divider connected between the voltage rails. This can be improved by replacing the lower resistor with a zener diode with a breakdown voltage equal to the required reference voltage. The zener acts as a voltage regulator stabilising the reference voltage against supply and load variations.

=== Zener diode ===
Two shunt diode clipper circuit

In the example circuit on the right, two zener diodes are used to clip the voltage V_{IN}. The voltage in either direction is limited to the reverse breakdown voltage plus the forward voltage drop across one zener diode.

=== Op-amp precision clipper ===
For very small values of clipping voltage on low-level signals the I-V curve of the diode can result in clipping onset that is not very sharp. Precision clippers can be made by placing the clipping device in the feedback circuit of an operational amplifier in a manner similar to precision rectifiers.

== Classification ==
Clippers may be classified into two types based on the positioning of the diode.

- Series clippers, where the diode is in series with the load resistance, and
- Shunt clippers, where the diode is shunted across the load resistance.

The diode capacitance affects the operation of the clipper at high frequency and influences the choice between the above two types. High frequency signals are attenuated in the shunt clipper as the diode capacitance provides an alternative path to output current. In the series clipper, clipping effectiveness is reduced for the same reason as the high frequency current passes through without being sufficiently blocked.

Clippers may be classified based on the orientation of the diode. The orientation decides which half cycle is affected by the clipping action.

The clipping action can be made to happen at an arbitrary level by using a biasing element (potential source) in series with the diode. In the following diagrams the green plot is the input voltage, the orange plot is the output voltage, and the blue plot is the clipping level voltage.

=== Positively biased diode clipper ===
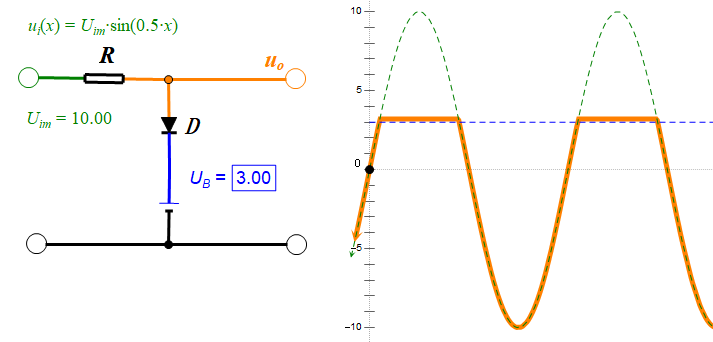
Positive peak clipping at a positive voltage. When u_{i} > U_{B}，diode is conducting，and u_{o} = U_{B}.

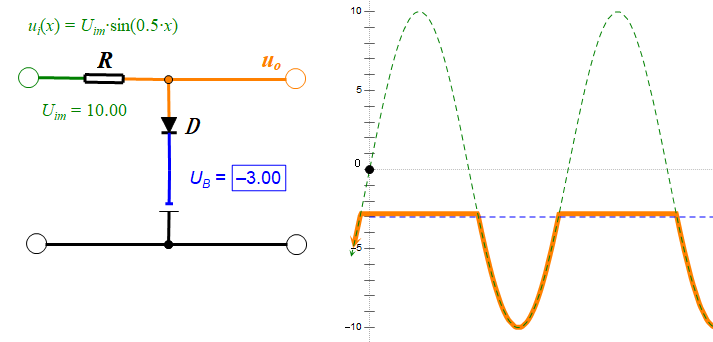
Positive peak clipping at a negative voltage. In this circuit, a short circuit output will result in a large current being driven through the diode by U_{B} and may damage it.

=== Negatively biased diode clipper ===
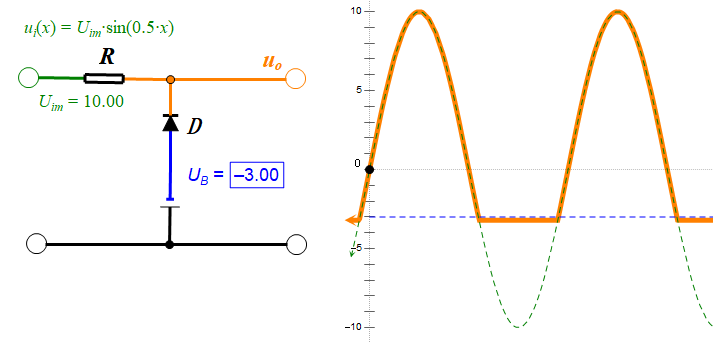
Negative peak clipping at a negative voltage. When u_{i} < U_{B}，diode is conducting，and u_{o} = U_{B}.

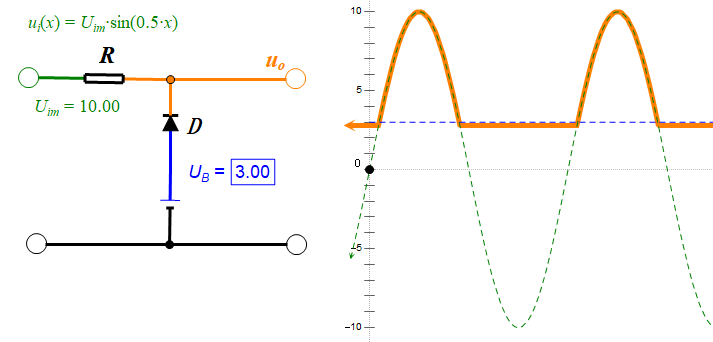
Negative peak clipping at a positive voltage. In this circuit, a short circuit output will result in a large current being driven through the diode by U_{B} and may damage it.

=== Combinational two-level diode clipper ===
The signal can be clipped to between two levels by using both types of diode clippers in combination.

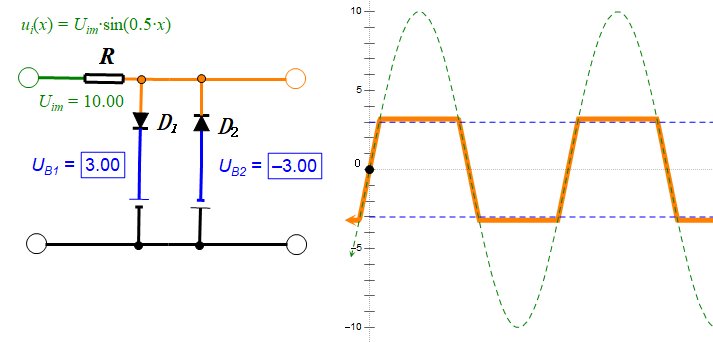
When u_{i} > U_{B1}，D1 is conducting，and u_{o} = U_{B1}. When u_{i} < U_{B2}，D2 is conducting，and u_{o} = U_{B2}.

=== Clamping circuit ===
A clamper circuit is not a clipper, but the simple diode version has a similar topology to a clipper with the exception that the resistor is replaced with a capacitor. The clamper circuit fixes either the positive or negative peaks at a fixed voltage (determined by the biasing voltage) rather than clipping them off.

== See also ==
- Amplitude gate
- Clipping (signal processing)
- Orifice plate which can function as a mechanical clipper for acoustic signals.
- Limiter
- Rectifier
