= Clipping (audio) =

Form of waveform distortion

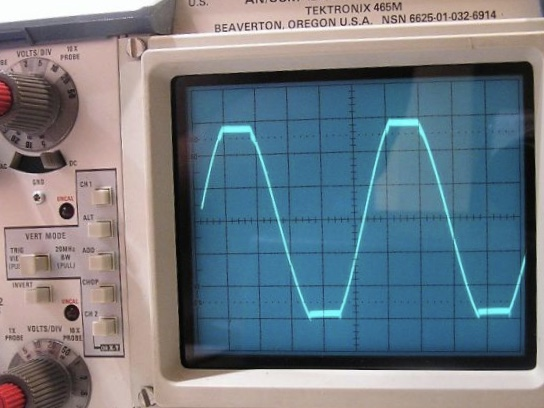
The altered peaks and troughs of the sine wave form displayed on this oscilloscope indicate the signal has been "clipped."

Clipping is a form of waveform distortion that occurs when an amplifier is overdriven and attempts to deliver an output voltage or current beyond its maximum capability. Driving an amplifier into clipping may cause it to output power in excess of its power rating.

In the frequency domain, clipping produces strong harmonics in the high-frequency range (as the clipped waveform comes closer to a square wave). The extra high-frequency weighting of the signal could make tweeter damage more likely than if the signal were not clipped.

In most cases, the distortion associated with clipping is unwanted and is visible on an oscilloscope even if it is inaudible. However, clipping is often used in music for artistic effect, particularly guitar-dominant genres like blues, rock, and metal.

== Overview ==
When an amplifier is pushed to create a signal with more power than its power supply can produce, it will amplify the signal only up to its maximum capacity, at which point the signal can be amplified no further. As the signal simply "cuts" or "clips" at the maximum capacity of the amplifier, the signal is said to be "clipping". The extra signal, which is beyond the capability of the amplifier, is simply cut off, resulting in a sine wave becoming a distorted square-wave-type waveform.

Amplifiers have voltage, current and thermal limits. Clipping may occur due to limitations in the power supply or the output stage. Some amplifiers are able to deliver peak power without clipping for short durations before energy stored in the power supply is depleted or the amplifier begins to overheat.

== Sound ==
Many electric guitar players intentionally overdrive their amplifiers (or insert a fuzz box) to cause clipping in order to get a desired sound.

Some audiophiles believe that the clipping behavior of vacuum tubes with little or no negative feedback is superior to that of transistors, in that vacuum tubes clip more gradually than transistors (i.e. soft clipping, and mostly even harmonics), resulting in harmonic distortion that is generally less objectionable.

== Effects ==
Difference between clipped and maximum unclipped waveforms

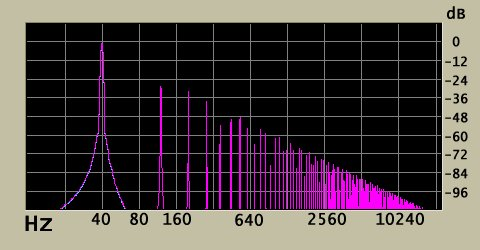
Spectrograph showing the odd-order harmonics of a sine wave pushed into hard clipping

In a transistorized amplifier with hard clipping, the gain of the transistor will be reduced (leading to nonlinear distortion) as the output current increases and the voltage across the transistor reduces close to the saturation voltage (for bipolar transistors), and so "full power" for the purposes of measuring distortion in amplifiers is usually taken as a few percent below clipping.

Because the clipped waveform has more area underneath it than the smaller unclipped waveform, the amplifier produces more power than its rated (sine wave) output when it is clipping. This extra power can damage the loudspeaker. It may cause damage to the amplifier's power supply or simply blow a fuse.

The additional high-frequency energy in the harmonics generated by an amplifier operating in clipping can damage the tweeter in a connected loudspeaker via overheating.

Clipping can occur within a system as processing (e.g., an all-pass filter) can change the phase relationship between spectral components of a signal in such a way as to create excessive peak outputs. The excessive peaks may become clipped even though the system can play any simple sine wave signals of the same level without clipping.

Electric guitarists frequently and intentionally overdrive their guitar amplifiers to cause clipping and other distortion in order to get a desired sound.

== Digital clipping ==
Clipped digital (PCM) waveform

In digital signal processing, clipping occurs when the signal is restricted by the range of a chosen representation. For example, in a system using 16-bit signed integers, 32767 is the largest positive value that can be represented. If, during processing, the amplitude of the signal is doubled, sample values of, for instance, 32000 should become 64000, but instead cause an integer overflow and saturate to the maximum, 32767. Clipping is preferable to the alternative in digital systems—wrapping—which occurs if the digital processor is allowed to overflow, ignoring the most significant bits of the magnitude, and sometimes even the sign of the sample value, resulting in gross distortion of the signal.

== Avoiding clipping ==
The simplest way to avoid clipping is to reduce the signal level. Alternatively, the system can be improved to support a higher signal level without clipping. Some audiophiles will use amplifiers that are rated for power outputs over twice the speaker's ratings. Since clipping can be thought of as acting as a crude form of signal limiter, a proper limiter can be used to safely and dynamically bring the levels of the loud parts of a signal down (for example, bass and snare drums).

Many amplifier designers have incorporated circuits to prevent clipping. The simplest circuits act like a fast limiter, which engages about one decibel before the clipping point. A more complex circuit, called "soft-clip", has been used from the 1980s onward to limit the signal at the input stage. The soft-clip feature begins to engage prior to clipping, for instance, starting at 10 dB below maximum output power. The output waveform retains a rounded characteristic even in the presence of an overload input signal as much as 10 dB higher than maximum specified.

== Repairing a clipped signal ==
It is preferable to avoid clipping, but if a recording has clipped and cannot be re-recorded, repair is an option. The goal of repair is to make up a plausible replacement for the clipped part of the signal.

Complex hard-clipped signals cannot be restored to their original state because the information contained in the peaks that are clipped is completely lost. Soft-clipped signals can be restored to their original state to within a case-dependent tolerance because no part of the original signal is completely lost. In this case, the degree of information loss is proportional to the degree of compression caused by the clipping. Lightly clipped bandwidth-limited signals that are highly oversampled have the potential for perfect repair.

Several methods can partially restore a clipped signal. Once the clipped portion is known, one can attempt partial recovery. One such method is interpolation or extrapolation of known samples. Advanced implementations may use cubic splines to attempt to restore a continuously differentiable signal. While these reconstructions are only an approximation of the original, the subjective quality may be improved. Other methods include copying the signal directly from one stereo channel to another, as it may be the case that only one channel is clipped.

Several software solutions of varying results and methods exist to repair clipping: CrumplePop ClipRemover, MAGIX Sound Forge, iZotope RX De-Clip, Acon Digital Restoration Suite, Adobe Audition, Thimeo Stereo Tool, declipping solutions from CEDAR Audio, and Audacity plugins such as Clip Fix.

== Causes ==
In analog audio equipment, there are several causes of clipping:

1. The peak-to-peak output of a solid-state transformerless amplifier is limited by the power supply voltage. (Note: This includes most integrated circuit and discrete solid state circuits. The limitation relative to the power supply voltage depends on the design of the circuit (especially the driver configuration) and the saturation voltage (V_{ce(sat)} for bipolar transistors, or R_{ds(on)} for Field Effect Transistors), and further reduced if the output stage does not have a quiescent DC output voltage set to half the supply voltage. For example, with a typical operational amplifier the Absolute Maximum Rating for the supply voltage is 36 volts, and a safe operating design supply voltage is 30 volts; if this was supplied as a perfectly balanced +15V and -15V then the theoretical peak output for an ideal rail-to-rail opamp would be 15 Volts peak (10.6V RMS, 30V peak-to-peak), but a real-world opamp such as the 741 is likely to only be able to drive about 10 volts peak into loads above 2 kilohms, i.e. about 7.1V RMS).)
2. An amplifier may have an asymmetrical output swing (Note: Possibly because a transistor is biased so its collector voltage is not half the supply voltage (or the "balanced" power supply rails aren't perfectly balanced). Bootstrapping or a redesign of the circuit may alleviate this when it is caused by difficulties in driving emitter follower output stages.) and clipping may begin earlier on one half of the output waveform.
3. In audio amplifiers using unregulated linear power supplies, if the filter capacitor is not large enough, it is possible for ripple voltage to cause clipping that also contains some AC line frequency harmonics. In a switched-mode power supply the switching frequency is more dominant in the ripple voltage and outside the audio band, while in a regulated power supply the ripple voltage is rejected.
4. A vacuum tube can only move a limited number of electrons in a given amount of time, dependent on its size, temperature, and metals. The resulting fall-off in amplification with increasing output current results in soft clipping.
5. Amplifying devices may also have limits on their inputs, for example, excessive base current to a bipolar transistor or excessive grid current to a vacuum tube. Operating outside these limits can distort the input signal, if it comes from a high enough impedance source, or damage the amplifying device, requiring a limiting circuit for protection; see below.
6. An amplifier may limit its current output, or the input voltage, for a variety of reasons, both intentional or not. Intentional limiting circuits would not be expected to come into effect in normal operation, but only when the output load resistance is too low or the input signal level is exceptionally high, for example. The result of this form of clipping might not create a flat top to the voltage waveform, but rather a flat top to the current waveform.
7. A transformer (most commonly used between stages and at the output in tube equipment) will clip when its ferromagnetic core becomes electromagnetically saturated.

== Detection ==
Clipping in a circuit can be detected by comparing the original input signal with an output signal with adjustment for applied gain. For instance, if a circuit has 10 dB of applied gain, it can be tested for clipping by attenuating the output signal by 10 dB and comparing it to the input signal. The difference between the two signals can be used to illuminate clipping detection indicators and can be used to decrease the gain of a preceding circuit to manage clipping.

Clipped signals will often be squared off, where third harmonics are contextual outliers in a Fourier Transform. In the case of an expected sine wave, the presence of odd harmonics will often suggest the signal has been hard clipped. A “soft clip” will have a knee on both sides of the plateau, which will show the presence of several even overtones in the lower frequency spectrum.

== See also ==
- Clipper (electronics)
- Dynamic range compression
- Tube sound
