= LV-661 =

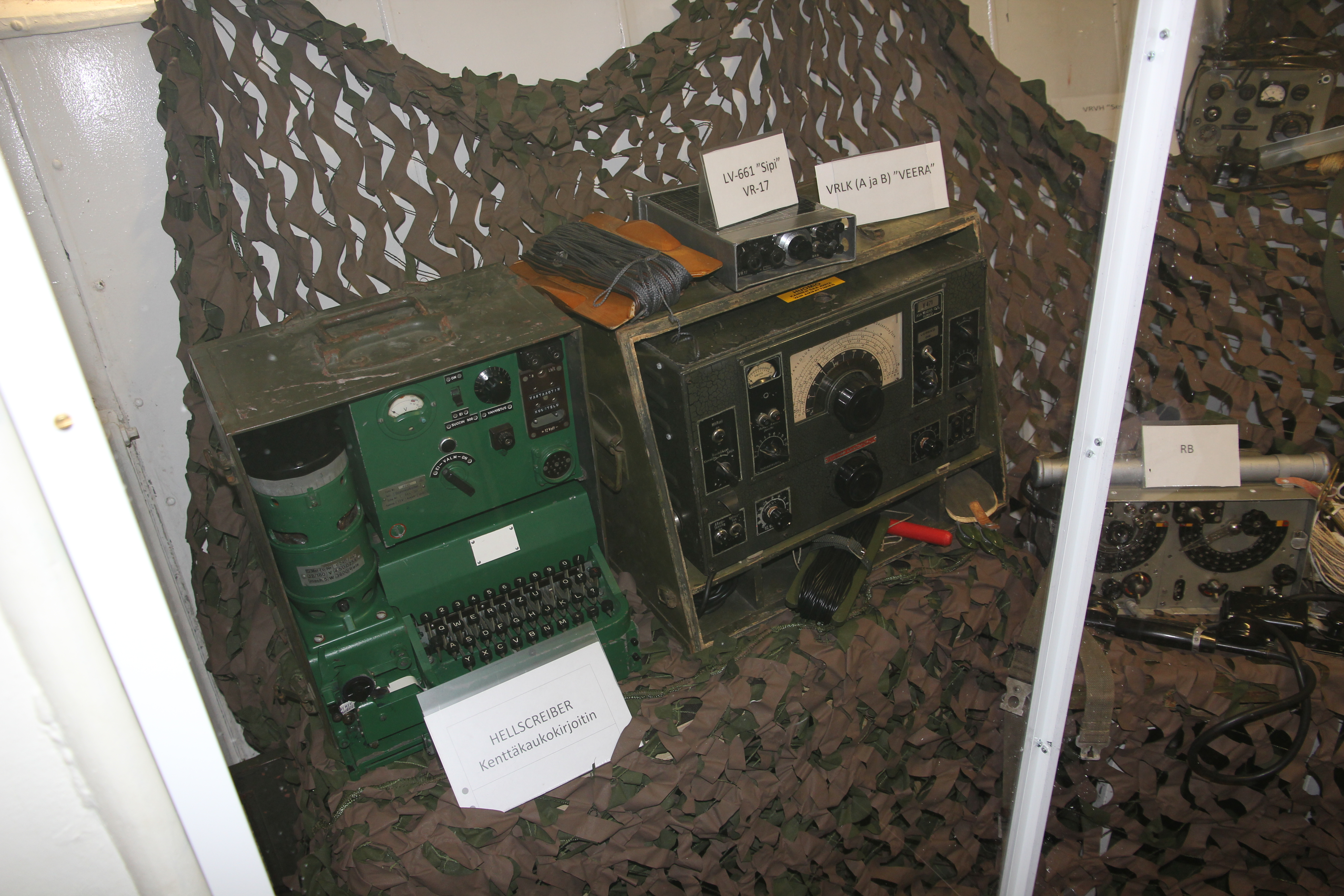
An array of VHF transceivers. From left to right: German Hellschreiber teleprinter, Finnish LV-661 "Sipi" VR-17 and VRLK "Veera" radio receiver, and Soviet World War 2 agent radio RB (ΤИП-ΡЬ).

The LV-661 is a HF radio developed by the Finnish Defence Forces in the early 1960s. Its previous type designation in the Finnish Defence Forces before the 1970s designation was VR 17. The radio was developed as a guerrilla radio to replace the Kyynel radios used by long-distance patrols during World War 2. The first proposal for a guerrilla radio was made in 1953, but because it was implemented using vacuum tube technology, like the Kyynel radio, the proposal was not accepted, and instead the possibilities of transistor technology were investigated. Production of a guerrilla radio implemented using transistor technology began in early 1960. In the mid-1970s, the LV 661 radios were centralized at the Paratrooper School and were taken out of service in the 1980s. The number of radios produced was approximately 130. The radios were manufactured by Televa.

== See also ==
- List of radios
