= Improved Layer 2 Protocol =

IL2P (Improved Layer 2 Protocol) is a data link layer protocol originally derived from layer 2 of the X.25 protocol suite and designed for use by amateur radio operators. It is used exclusively on amateur packet radio networks.

IL2P establishes link layer connections, transferring data encapsulated in frames between nodes, and detecting errors introduced by the communications channel.

The Improved Layer 2 Protocol (IL2P) was created by Nino Carrillo, KK4HEJ, based on AX.25 version 2.0 and implements Reed–Solomon forward error correction for greater accuracy and throughput than either AX.25 or FX.25. Specifically, in order to achieve greater stability on link speeds higher than 1200 baud.

IL2P can be used with a variety of modulation methods including AFSK and GFSK. The direwolf software TNC contains the first open source implementation of the protocol.

== IL2P specification ==
The IL2P draft specification v0.6 was published via the Terrestrial Amateur Radio Packet Network (TARPN) on March 16, 2024.

As of version 0.6, it added trailing CRC description. Removed weak-signal extensions. Corrected description of block scrambling. Removed reference to baseline FEC level. Added BPSK and QPSK symbol maps. Updated example encoded packets.

== Implementations ==
IL2P was first implemented in the closed source and proprietary ninoTNC to solve for lossy network links due to low signal-to-noise ratio or weak signal strength.

The specification itself outlines several design goals including:

- Forward error correction
- Eliminating bit-stuffing
- Streamlining the AX.25 header format
- Improved packet detection in the absence of Decode (DCD) and for open-squelch receive
- Produce a bitstream suitable for modulation on various physical layers
- Avoid bit-error-amplifying methods (differential encoding and free-running LFSRs)
- Increase efficiency and simplicity over FX.25 Forward Error Correction

== See also ==
- NCpacket group
