= Automatic Packet Reporting System =

Amateur radio telemetry forwarding protocol

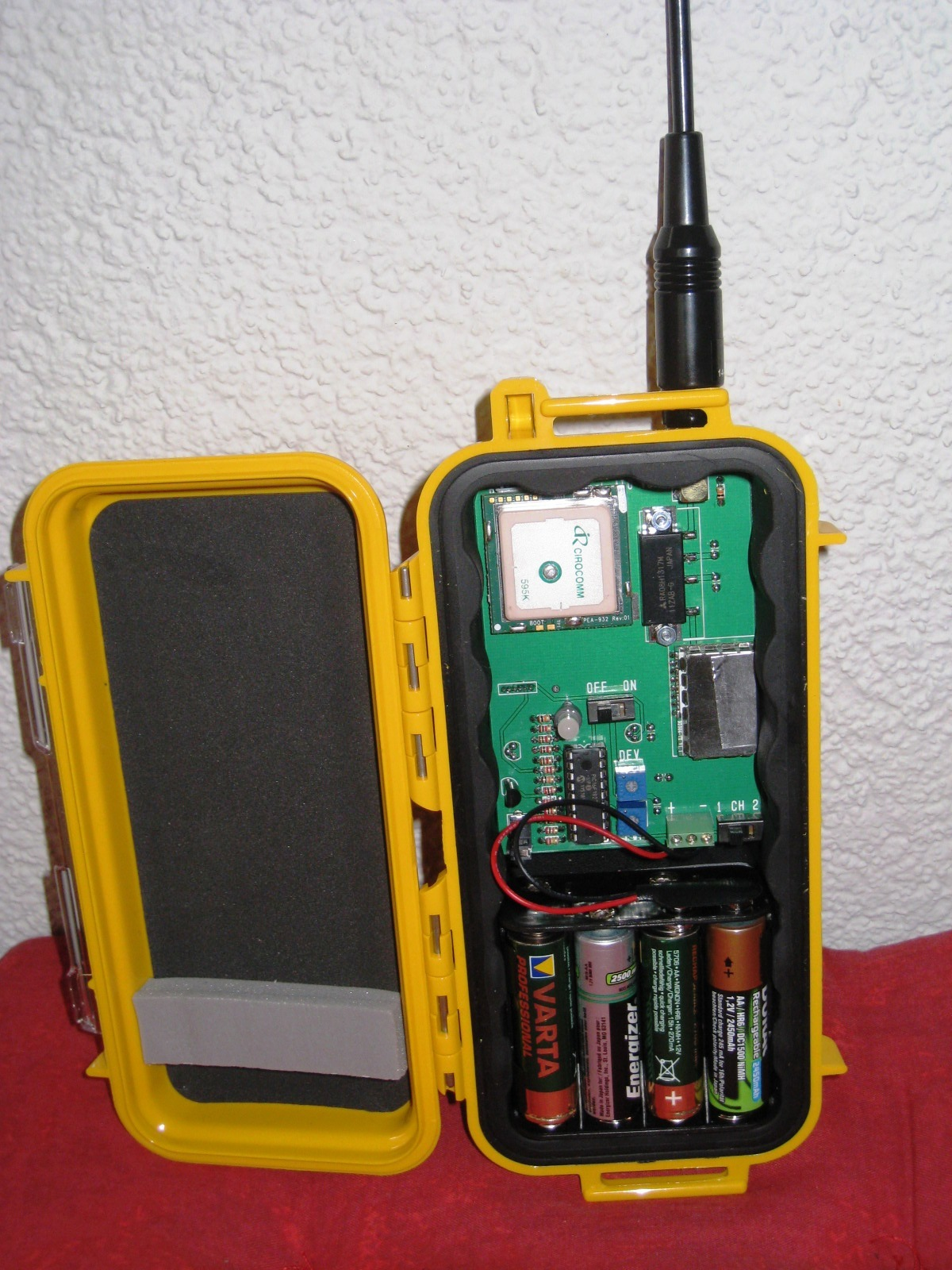
APRS beacon transmitter with GPS receiver.

Automatic Packet Reporting System (APRS) is an amateur radio-based system for real time digital communications of information of immediate value in the local area. Data can include object Global Positioning System (GPS) coordinates, non-directional beacon, weather station telemetry, text messages, announcements, queries, and other telemetry. APRS data can be displayed on a map, which can show stations, objects, tracks of moving objects, weather stations, search and rescue data, and direction finding data.

APRS data is typically transmitted on a single shared frequency (depending on country) to be repeated locally by area relay stations (digipeaters) for widespread local consumption. In addition, all such data are typically ingested into the APRS Internet System (APRS-IS) via an Internet-connected receiver (IGate) and distributed globally for ubiquitous and immediate access. Data shared via radio or Internet are collected by all users and can be combined with external map data to build a shared live view.

APRS was developed from the late 1980s forward by Bob Bruninga, call sign WB4APR, a senior research engineer at the United States Naval Academy. He maintained the main APRS web site until his death in 2022. The initialism "APRS" was derived from his call sign.

In March 2022 the APRS Foundation was formed as a not-for-profit with the objective of "[...] preservation and advancement of the Automatic Packet Reporting System (APRS) digital communications protocol."

== History ==
Bob Bruninga, a senior research engineer at the United States Naval Academy, implemented the earliest ancestor of APRS on an Apple II computer in 1982. This early version was used to map high frequency Navy position reports. The first use of APRS was in 1984, when Bruninga developed a more advanced version on a VIC-20 for reporting the position and status of horses in a 100-mile (160 km) endurance run.

During the next two years, Bruninga continued to develop the system, which he then called the Connectionless Emergency Traffic System (CETS). Following a series of Federal Emergency Management Agency (FEMA) exercises using CETS, the system was ported to the IBM Personal Computer. During the early 1990s, CETS (then known as the Automatic Position Reporting System) continued to evolve into its current form.

As GPS technology became more widely available, "Position" was replaced with "Packet" to better describe the more generic capabilities of the system and to emphasize its uses beyond mere position reporting.

Bruninga has also stated that APRS was not meant to be a vehicle position tracking system, and can be interpreted rather as "Automatic Presence Reporting System".

== Network overview ==
APRS is a digital communications protocol for exchanging information among a large number of stations covering a large (local) area, often referred to as "IP-ers". As a multi-user data network, it is quite different from conventional packet radio. Rather than using connected data streams where stations connect to each other and packets are acknowledged and retransmitted if lost, APRS operates entirely in an unconnected broadcast fashion, using unnumbered AX.25 frames.

APRS packets are transmitted for all other stations to hear and use. Packet repeaters, called digipeaters, form the backbone of the APRS system, and use store and forward technology to retransmit packets. All stations operate on the same radio channel, and packets move through the network from digipeater to digipeater, propagating outward from their point of origin. All stations within radio range of each digipeater receive the packet. At each digipeater, the packet path is changed. The packet will be repeated through only a certain number of digipeaters — or hops — depending upon the all-important "PATH" setting.

Digipeaters keep track of the packets they forward for a period of time, thus preventing duplicate packets from being retransmitted. This keeps packets from circulating in endless loops inside the ad hoc network. Eventually, most packets are heard by an APRS Internet Gateway, called an IGate, and the packets are routed on to the Internet APRS backbone (where duplicate packets heard by other IGates are discarded) for display or analysis by other users connected to an APRS-IS server, or on a website designed for the purpose.

While it would seem that using unconnected and unnumbered packets without acknowledgment and retransmission on a shared and sometimes congested channel would result in poor reliability due to a packet being lost, this is not the case, because the packets are transmitted (broadcast) to everyone and multiplied many times over by each digipeater. This means that all digipeaters and stations in range get a copy, and then proceed to broadcast it to all other digipeaters and stations within their range. The result is that packets are multiplied more than they are lost. Therefore, packets can sometimes be heard some distance from the originating station. Packets can be digitally repeated tens or even hundreds of kilometers, depending on the height and range of the digipeaters in the area.

When a packet is transmitted, it is duplicated many times as it radiates out, taking all available paths simultaneously, until the number of "hops" allowed by the path setting is consumed.

== Positions/objects/items ==
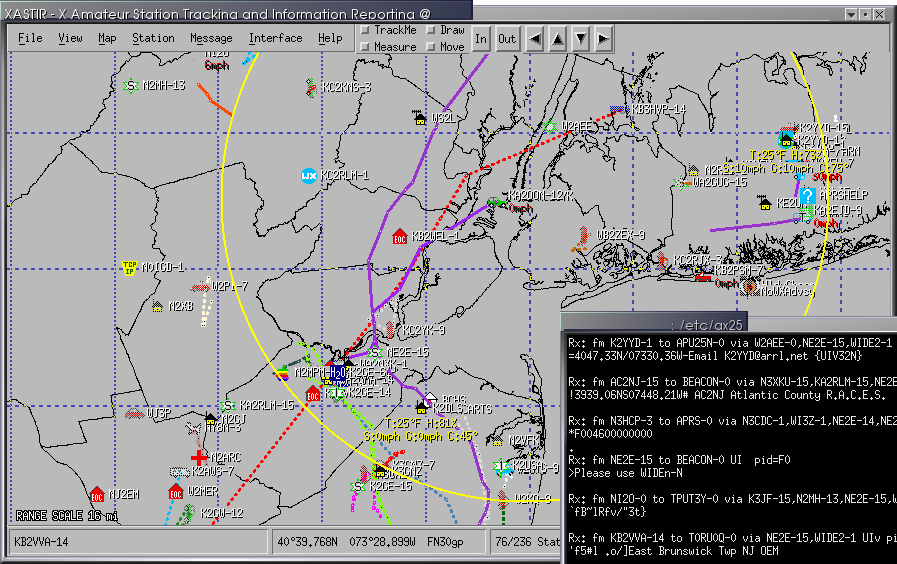
Screenshot of an APRS display in XASTIR, an APRS software system for Linux/Unix. Station positions, objects and items are displayed on a map overlaying counties around New York City. Raw APRS messages are displayed in the terminal window on the lower right.

APRS contains a number of packet types, including position/object/item, status, messages, queries, weather reports and telemetry. The position/object/item packets contain the latitude and longitude, and a symbol to be displayed on the map, and have many optional fields for altitude, course, speed, radiated power, antenna height above average terrain, antenna gain, and voice operating frequency. Positions of fixed stations are configured in the APRS software. Moving stations (portable or mobile) automatically derive their position information from a GPS receiver connected to the APRS equipment.

The map display uses these fields to plot communication range of all participants and facilitate the ability to contact users during both routine and emergency situations. Each position/object/item packet can use any of several hundred different symbols. Position/objects/items can also contain weather information or can be any number of dozens of standardised weather symbols. Each symbol on an APRS map can display many attributes, discriminated either by colour or other technique. These attributes are:

- Moving or fixed
- Dead-reckoned or old
- Message capable or not
- Station, object or item
- Own object or other station object/item
- Emergency, priority, or special

== Status/messages ==
The Status packet is free-field format that lets each station announce its current mission or application or contact information or any other information or data of immediate use to surrounding activities. The message packet can be used for point-to-point messages, bulletins, announcements or even email. Bulletins and Announcements are treated specially and displayed on a single "community Bulletin board". This community bulletin board is fixed size and all bulletins from all posters are sorted onto this display. The intent of this display is to be consistent and identical for all viewers so that all participants are seeing the same information at the same time. Since lines are sorted onto the display, then individual posters can edit, update, or delete individual lines of their bulletins at any time to keep the bulletin board up-to-date to all viewers.

All APRS messages are delivered live in real-time to online recipients. Messages are not stored and forwarded, but retried until timed out. The delivery of these messages is global, since the APRS-IS distributes all packets to all other IGates in the world and those that are messages will actually go back to RF via any IGate that is near the intended recipient.

=== Email ===
A special case message can be sent to EMAIL where these messages are pulled off the real-time APRS-IS and wrapped into a standard email message type, and forwarded into regular Internet email. This was done by the WU2Z email engine until 2019 , when it was replaced by the javAPRSSrvr email gateway.

== Capabilities ==
In its simplest implementation, APRS is used to transmit real-time data, information and, optionally, reports of the exact location of a person or object via a data signal sent over amateur radio frequencies. In addition to real-time position reporting capabilities using attached GPS receivers, APRS is also capable of transmitting a wide variety of data, including weather reports, short text messages, radio direction finding bearings, telemetry data, short e-mail messages (send only) and storm forecasts. Once transmitted, these reports can be combined with a computer and mapping software to show the transmitted data superimposed with great precision upon a map display.

While the map plotting is the most visible feature of APRS, the text messaging capabilities and local information distribution capabilities, combined with the robust network, should not be overlooked; the New Jersey Office of Emergency Management has an extensive network of APRS stations to allow text messaging between all of the county Emergency Operating Centers in the event of the failure of conventional communications.

== Technical information ==
1200 baud APRS signal
Example of a 1,200-baud AFSK modulated APRS signal.

In its most widely used form, APRS is transported over the AX.25 protocol using 1,200-bit/s Bell 202 AFSK on frequencies located within the 2-meter amateur band (but the 70-centimeter band is also used, most notably by the ISS digital repeater).

Sample APRS VHF frequencies

- 144.39 MHz : North America, Argentina, Colombia, Chile, Indonesia, Malaysia, Singapore, Thailand
- 144.575 MHz : New Zealand
- 144.64 MHz : China, Taiwan
- 144.66 MHz : Japan
- 144.8 MHz : South Africa, Europe, Russia
- 144.93 MHz : Uruguay, Panama
- 145.175 MHz : Australia
- 145.57 MHz : Brazil
- 145.825 MHz : Certain satellites (Formerly International Space Station)

Sample APRS UHF frequencies

- 430.5125 MHz : Netherlands (Phased out due to transition to 432.5 MHz)
- 432.5 MHz : Europe
- 437.825 MHz : International Space Station

An extensive digital repeater, or "digipeater" network provides transport for APRS packets on these frequencies. Internet gateway stations (IGates) connect the on-air APRS network to the APRS Internet System (APRS-IS), which serves as a worldwide, high-bandwidth backbone for APRS data. Stations can tap into this stream directly, and a number of databases connected to the APRS-IS allow web-based access to the data as well as more advanced data-mining capabilities. A number of low-Earth orbiting satellites, including the International Space Station, are capable of relaying APRS data.

== Equipment settings ==
An APRS infrastructure comprises a variety of Terminal Node Controller (TNC) equipment put in place by individual amateur radio operators. This includes sound cards interfacing a radio to a computer, simple TNCs, and "smart" TNCs. The "smart" TNCs are capable of determining what has already happened with the packet and can prevent redundant packet repeating within the network.

Reporting stations use a method of routing called a "path" to broadcast the information through a network. In a typical packet network, a station would use a path of known stations such as "via n8xxx,n8ary." This causes the packet to be repeated through the two stations before it stops. In APRS, generic call signs are assigned to repeater stations to allow a more automatic operation.

=== Recommended path ===
Throughout North America (and in many other regions) the recommended path for mobiles or portable stations is now WIDE1-1,WIDE2-1. Fixed Stations (homes, etc.) should not normally use a path routing if they do not need to be digitally repeated outside of their local area, otherwise a path of WIDE2-2 or less should be used as requirements dictate. The path parameter reflects the routing of packets via the radio component of APRS, and fixed stations should carefully consider their choice of path routing. Any path selection for stations that do not require it contributes to congestion of the APRS frequency and may hinder other stations' reporting. Aircraft and balloon APRS stations should avoid beaconing with any path at altitude since digipeating may not be necessary due to their antenna height and likelihood of reaching multiple wide-ranging digipeaters and IGates. Mobile stations in congested areas or more populated areas may consider using only 1 hop (WIDE1-1), as there are usually enough Internet gateways nearby that no path routing is needed. One solution to the path selection is proportional pathing if the user's equipment is capable.

=== Old path ===
Early on, the widely accepted method of configuring stations was to enable the short-range stations to repeat packets requesting a path of "RELAY" and long-range stations were configured to repeat both "RELAY" and "WIDE" packets. This was accomplished by setting the station's MYALIAS setting to RELAY or WIDE as needed. This resulted in a path of RELAY,WIDE for reporting stations. However, there was no duplicate packet checking or alias substitution. This sometimes caused beacons to "ping pong" back and forth instead of propagating outwards from the source. This caused much interference. With no alias substitution, one could not tell which digipeaters a beacon had used.

=== New path ===
With the advent of the new "smart" TNCs, the stations that used to be "WIDE" became "WIDEn-N." This means a packet with a path of WIDE2-2 would be repeated through the first station as WIDE2-2, but the path will be modified (decremented) to WIDE2-1 for the next station to repeat. The packet stops being repeated when the "-N" portion of the path reaches "-0." This new protocol has caused the old RELAY and WIDE paths to become obsolete. Digi operators are being asked to re-configure fill-in "RELAY" stations to instead respond to WIDE1-1. This results in a new, more efficient path of WIDE1-1,WIDE2-1.

=== Amateur Radio High Altitude Balloons ===
Testing radio range is often a large component of these hobbies. Amateur radio is often used with packet radio to communicate at 1200 baud, using the Automatic Packet Reporting System back to the ground station. Smaller packages called micro or pico trackers are also built and run under smaller balloons. These smaller trackers have used Morse code, Feld Hell, and RTTY to transmit their locations and other data.

== Related systems ==
The APRS protocol has been adapted and extended to support projects not directly related to its original purpose. The most notable of these are the FireNet and PropNET projects.

- APRS FireNet is an Internet-based system using the APRS protocol and much of the same client software to provide fire fighting, earthquake, and weather information in much higher volume and detail than the traditional APRS system is capable of carrying.
- PropNET uses the APRS protocol over AX.25 and PSK31 to study radio frequency propagation. PropNET "probes" transmit position reports, along with information on transmitter power, elevation, and antenna gain, at various frequencies to allow monitoring stations to detect changes in propagation conditions. It is based on ACDS, a special client program running under Microsoft Windows.

== See also ==
- APRS Calling
- APRS Documentation Project - includes latest protocol specification
- Automatic identification system—position reporting system used for marine traffic
- Spartan Packet Radio Experiment—an experiment intended to test the tracking of satellites via amateur packet radio, flown on Space Shuttle mission STS-72.
- Traffic collision avoidance system (TCAS)
