= Bell 202 =

Modem standard developed by Bell System in 1976

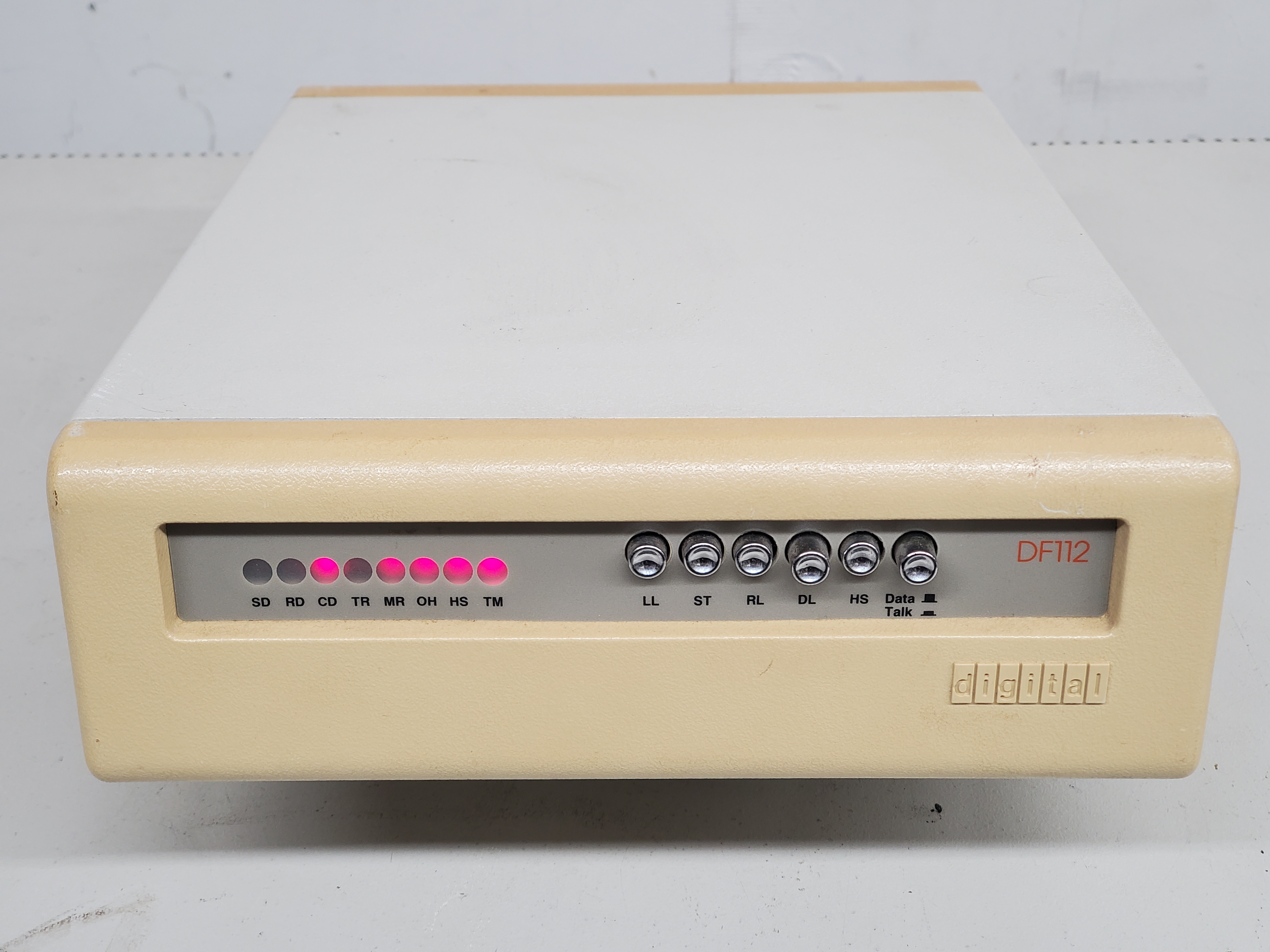
The DEC DF112 from the mid-1980s used the Bell 202 protocol.

The Bell 202 modem was an early (1976) modem standard developed by the Bell System. It specifies audio frequency-shift keying (AFSK) to encode and transfer data at a rate of 1200 bits per second (bit/s), half-duplex. It has separate sets of circuits for 1200 bit/s and 300 bit/s rates. These signalling protocols, also used in third-party modems, are referred to generically as Bell 202 modulation, and any device employing it as Bell-202-compatible.

- Bell 202 AFSK uses a 1200 Hz tone for mark (typically a binary 1) and 2200 Hz for space (typically a binary 0).

In North America, Bell 202 AFSK modulation is used to transmit Caller ID information over POTS lines in the public telephone network. It is also employed in some commercial settings.

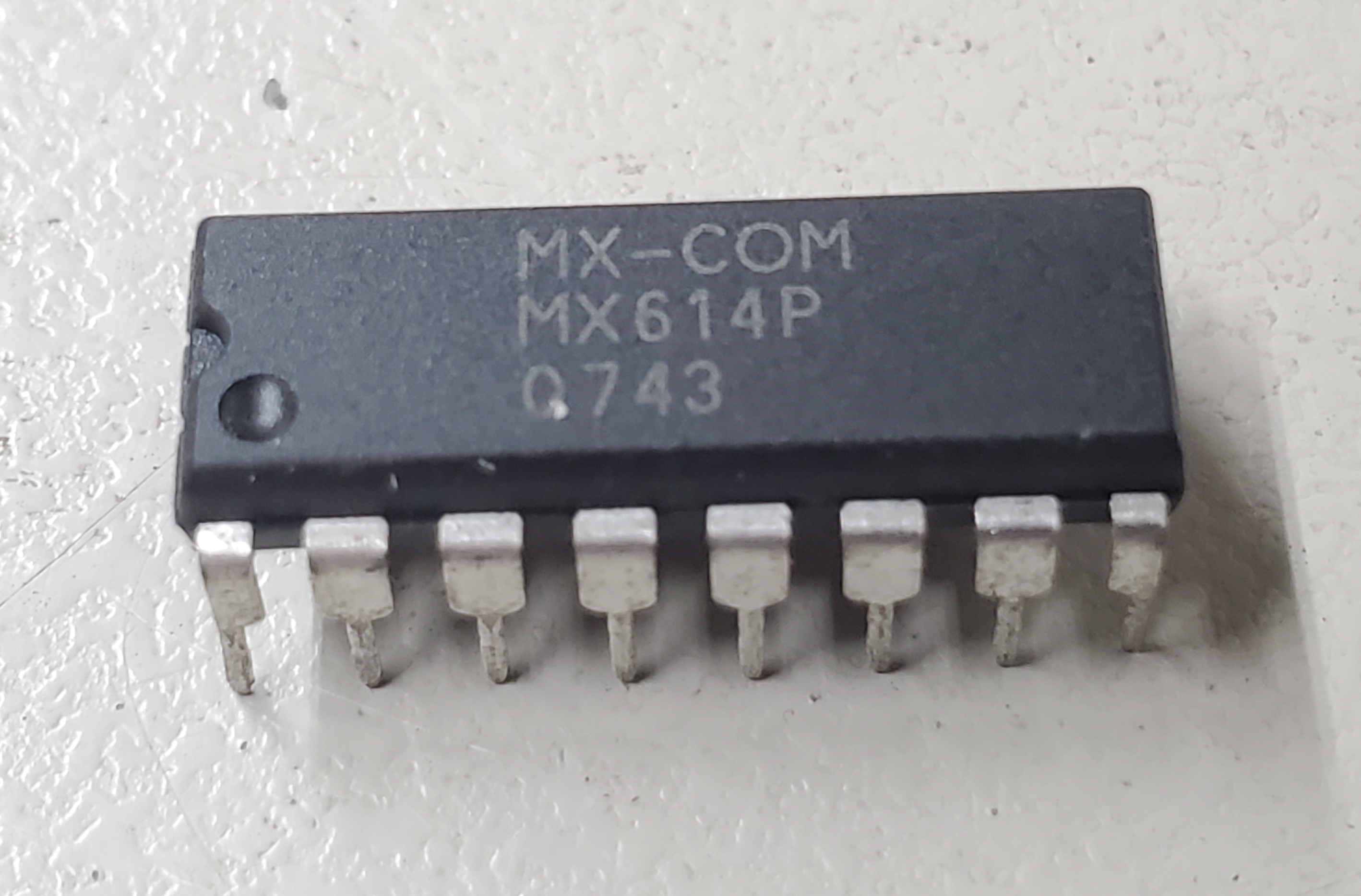
A single chip implementation of the Bell 202 protocol, c. 2007

In addition, Bell 202 is the basis for the most commonly used physical layer for the HART Communication Protocol—a communication protocol widely used in the process industries.

Surplus Bell 202 modems were used by amateur radio operators to construct the first packet radio stations, despite its low signalling speed. A modified Bell 202 AFSK modulation, a common physical layer for AX.25, remains the standard for amateur VHF operation in most areas. Automatic Packet Reporting System (APRS) transmissions are encoded this way on VHF. On HF, APRS uses Bell 103 modulation.

The Bell 202 standard was adopted around 1980 as the communications standard for subsea oil and gas production control systems, pioneered by the then FSSL (Ferranti Subsea Systems Ltd.) Controls, a spin-out company from the former TRW – Ferranti joint venture in the UK. This modulation standard was retained until around 2000, when it was superseded by faster FSK and PSK modulation methods, although it is still utilised for extension of existing control systems that are already configured for this technique.

The 202 standard permitted useful techniques such as multi-dropping of slave modems to allow multiple nodes to be connected to the host via a single modem channel. Other techniques have included superposition of signal on power conductors, and distances in excess of 80 km (50 mi) were achieved in subsea applications using these techniques. This has been enhanced through the use of Manchester encoding over the FSK link, to provide simple Modulo-2 RZ (return to zero) bit error detection and suppression improvement over these long distances.

== Related technology ==
The ITU-T V.23 communications standard defines a similar modulation scheme.

== See also ==
- Caller ID
- HART Communication Protocol (Highway Addressable Remote Transducer) - a communication protocol used in the process industries.
