= APRS Calling =

Brevity code used via APRS to request communications elsewhere

APRS Calling is a manual procedure for calling stations on the Automatic Packet Reporting System (APRS) to initiate communications on another frequency, or possibly by other means. It is inspired by Digital Selective Calling, a part of the Global Maritime Distress Safety System. It also builds on existing digital procedures inherited from morse code and radioteletype operation. ITU Q codes are used in conjunction with APRS text messages to implement APRS calling. APRS calling is intended to complement monitoring voice calling frequencies.

== Procedure ==
1. The calling station sends a QSX signal to the station or group they wish to reach using an APRS text message. The QSX should include the necessary information for contact, possibly including frequency and mode.
2. Once the called station or stations are ready to communicate on the specified channel, they answer using a QSX text message on APRS.
3. The stations shift communications to the arranged channel.

== Example ==
All APRS transmissions include the call sign programmed into the APRS unit. The text message doesn't necessarily require the station identification commonly seen in voice, CW or RTTY exchanges, so long as the programmed call sign is valid.

This example shows N6BRK announcing a net on 147.480 MHz to the NALCO APRS group. When ready to communicate on the coordinated frequency, KJ6VVJ responds with an acknowledgment to the QSX. If the operating mode isn't obvious in context of the frequency, the initiating stations QSX should specify what it is.

Sender	Recipient	Message
N6BRK	NALCO	QSX NALCO Net 147.480 MHz
KJ6VVJ	N6BRK	QSX

== See also ==
- ACP-131 - Combined Communications-Electronics Board Communications Instructions / Operating Signals
- Amateur radio
