= CW Skimmer =

Morse code decoder software

CW Skimmer is a multi-channel Morse code (CW) decoder and analyzer program for Microsoft Windows. It was created by Alex Shovkoplyas, VE3NEA, and is marketed by Afreet Software, Inc.

CW Skimmer uses a sensitive CW decoding algorithm based on the methods of Bayesian statistics, which allows simultaneous decoding of all CW signals in the receiver passband. The call signs are extracted from the decoded messages and displayed next to the signal traces on the waterfall. CW Skimmer also includes a DSP processor with a noise blanker, automatic gain control, and variable-bandwidth CW filter. It accepts TCP/IP network connections from telnet clients, presenting an interface similar to those of DX cluster programs.
