= Spartan Packet Radio Experiment =

The Spartan Packet Radio Experiment (SPRE) was an amateur radio communications experiment that flew on the Space Shuttle Endeavour's STS-72 mission as part of NASA's Spartan/OAST-Flyer spacecraft in January 1996. The experiment was intended to test the tracking of satellites via amateur packet radio (Automatic Packet Reporting System), and was designed and built by the Amateur Radio Association at the University of Maryland (W3EAX). Required GPS data for the experiment was provided by another portion of the Spartan payload. The operating mode was FM, AFSK 1200 baud packet radio, transmitted at 145.550 MHz.
