= ITU-T V.23 =

Modem standard

The V.23 standard was an early modem standard first approved by ITU-T precursor CCITT in 1964.

It specifies audio frequency-shift keying (AFSK) to encode and transfer data at a rate of 1200 bits per second, full-duplex at 1200 baud (Mode 2), (or at a fallback rate of 600 baud, mode 1) for the forward data-transmission channel, and an optional 75 baud backward channel.

- V.23 Mode 1 AFSK uses a 1300 Hz tone (F_{Z}) for mark (typically a binary 1) and 1700 Hz (F_{A}) for space (typically a binary 0), and a 1500 Hz center frequency (F_{0}).
- V.23 Mode 2 AFSK uses a 1300 Hz tone (F_{Z}) for mark (typically a binary 1) and 2100 Hz (F_{A}) for space (typically a binary 0), and a 1700 Hz center frequency (F_{0}).
- V.23 backward channel AFSK uses a 390 Hz tone (F_{Z}) for mark (typically a binary 1) and a 450 Hz (F_{A}) for space (typically a binary 0).

In some European countries, (and perhaps elsewhere), V.23 Mode 2 AFSK modulation, (without the backward channel) is used to transmit Caller ID information over POTS lines in the public telephone network.

The 75 baud backward channel was originally envisioned for use in error correction schemes, but V.23 was also widely used in Videotex applications where the backward channel was used to send keyboard data in an asymmetrical full duplex scheme in devices such as the French Minitel service, or the British Prestel service.

== Related technology ==
The Bell 202 communications standard defines a similar modulation scheme.

Caller ID uses V.23 to transmit displayed caller information.
