= DX cluster =

Network of computers

A DX cluster is a network of computers, each running a software package dedicated to gathering, and disseminating, information on amateur radio DX (long-distance contact) activities.

The computers comprising the network are called nodes, the network itself being termed a cluster of nodes. The nodes may be connected either via radio links or through the internet. Internet nodes generally connect using the telnet protocol.

The system acts as an aggregator of information, accepting input from various sources, then making that data available to any user who is connected to the network.

== History ==
The first DX cluster software, PacketCluster was realized by US radio amateur Dick Newell, AK1A in the late 1980s, and quickly became popular as a means of exchanging DX-related information. Before the Internet became widely available, the nodes running the cluster software would connect via radio links at certain frequencies allocated within the amateur radio bands. Users of the system would then connect to a node using frequencies different from those used by the nodes.

When the Internet became widely available, the system was expanded to make use of telnet connections to internet nodes, in addition to the already established packet radio nodes. Users of internet nodes connect to a particular node using telnet client software.

== DX cluster software ==
A number of DX cluster software packages are available, among which are:

- PacketCluster - the original, and still widely used, radio packet cluster software
- DX Spider - the most widely used of the internet-based cluster software packages
- CC Cluster
- Clusse - older cluster software
