= Ionica (company) =

Former British telecoms company

Ionica Logo

An Ionica dish

Ionica was a domestic telecoms provider based in Cambridge, UK, operating between 1995 and 1998.

Founded in 1991, Ionica offered an alternative technology to British Telecom. The Ionica system used a microwave transmitter in order to provide the local loop, thus avoiding reliance on British Telecom for this final link to the consumer. The technology, known as Wireless local loop (WLL), was developed in partnership with Nortel. However, rising costs and limiting technical factors caused the company to cease trading in 1998.

== Floatation ==
The company floated in July 1997 with shares initially trading at 390p. At its peak Ionica was valued at over one billion pounds, the first Silicon Fen company to reach that value.

== Goals and technical limitations ==
The company's initial aim was to take twenty per cent of the domestic market with offers such as multiple ringing tones and a free second line but the technology used proved to be limited, with heavy rain and local radio transmissions interfering with calls. Despite the technology having been used with great success in remote areas of Canada, it proved to be unsuitable in a British urban setting. In particular the technology used spectrum at 3.5 GHz, which limited line-of-sight range to the base station and was narrowband, which meant it could not provide broadband Internet access.

== Failure ==
First signs that Ionica was in trouble came when expansion plans were put on hold in an attempt to improve service and add much needed capacity in existing markets such as Yorkshire, The Midlands and East Anglia.

By March 1998 the company was looking to bring in an outside investor and shortly after failed to agree terms with existing investors for the £300 million debts already accumulated. By August 1998 Ionica had failed to find a 'strategic partner', and despite strong assurances that cash resources of £45 million would keep the company solvent until January 1999 many observers predicted its imminent demise.

== Into administration ==
On Thursday 29 October 1998 administrators were called in. The company's assets were valued at £250 million. The following Monday 2 November 1998 the administrators made around half of the company's 1,200 staff redundant.

The administration process was finally wound up in March 2009.

== Customer migration and end of service ==
From December 1998 onwards Ionica's 62,000 customers were gradually migrated to British Telecom with special prices being offered to support their move. In the meantime BT supported Ionica financially, allowing customers to continue using their telephones.

Service finally ceased on 28 February 1999.

== Former headquarters ==
The former Ionica building was constructed in 1994 and is located on St John's Innovation Park, adjacent to the A14. Despite an apparently desirable location the building remained vacant for much of the time since the demise of Ionica. CSR plc moved into the building in May 2007. The building was demolished in November 2024.
