= Phase angle =

Phase angle may refer to:

- Phase (waves), the angular displacement of a sinusoid from a reference point or time
- Phasor angle, angular component of the complex number representation of a sinusoid
- Analytic representation phase, instantaneous phase of an analytic signal representation
- Phase angle (astronomy), the angle between the incident light and reflected light

== See also ==
- Angle
- Polar coordinate system
