= IQ imbalance =

Problem affecting a class of radio receivers

IQ imbalance is a performance-limiting issue in the design of a class of radio receivers known as direct conversion receivers. (Note: These are also known as zero intermediate frequency or homodyne receivers.) These translate the received radio frequency (RF, or pass-band) signal directly from the carrier frequency $f_c$ to baseband using a single mixing stage. (Note: This contrasts with a traditional superheterodyne receiver, which needs an intermediate frequency stage between RF and baseband, and an image rejection filter. Direct conversion receivers contain fewer components, making them easier to miniaturise.)

Direct conversion receivers contain a local oscillator (LO) which generates both a sine wave at $f_c$ and a copy delayed by 90°. These are individually mixed with the RF signal, producing what are known respectively as the in-phase and quadrature signals, labelled $I$ and $Q$.

However, in the analog domain, the phase difference is never exactly 90°. Neither is the gain perfectly matched between the parallel sections of circuitry dealing with the two signal paths.

IQ imbalance results from these two imperfections, and is one of the two major drawbacks of direct-conversion receivers compared to traditional superheterodyne receivers. (The other is DC offset.) Their design must include measures to control IQ imbalance, so as to limit errors in the demodulated signal.

== Definition ==
A direct-conversion receiver uses two quadrature sinusoidal signals to perform the so-called quadrature down-conversion. This process requires shifting the LO signal by 90° to produce a quadrature sinusoidal component, and a matched pair of mixers converting the same input signal with the two versions of the LO. Mismatches between the two LO signals and/or along the two branches of down-conversion mixers, and any following amplifiers, and low-pass filters, cause the quadrature baseband signals to be corrupted, either due to amplitude or phase differences. Suppose the received pass-band signal is identical to the transmitted signal and is given by:
$$y(t)=\operatorname{Re}\{x(t)e^{j2\pi f_c t}\}=x_I(t)\cos(2\pi f_c t)-x_Q(t)\sin(2\pi f_c t)$$
where $x(t)=x_I(t)+jx_Q(t)$ is the transmitted base-band signal. Assume that the gain error is $20\log[(1+\varepsilon_A)/(1-\varepsilon_A)]$dB and the phase error is $\varepsilon_\theta$ degrees. Then we can model such imbalance using mismatched local oscillator output signals:
$$2(1+\varepsilon_A)\cos(2\pi f_c t-\varepsilon_\theta/2), \quad -2(1-\varepsilon_A)\sin(2\pi f_c t+\varepsilon_\theta/2).$$
Multiplying the pass-band signal by the two LO signals and passing through a pair of low-pass filters, one obtains the demodulated base-band signals as:
$$\begin{cases}
\tilde{x}_I(t) & =(1+\varepsilon_A)[x_I(t)\cos(\varepsilon_\theta/2)-x_Q(t)\sin(\varepsilon_\theta/2)] \\[6pt]
\tilde{x}_Q(t) & =(1-\varepsilon_A)[x_Q(t)\cos(\varepsilon_\theta/2)-x_I(t)\sin(\varepsilon_\theta/2)]
\end{cases}$$
The above equations clearly indicate that IQ imbalance causes interference between the $I$ and $Q$ base-band signals. To analyze IQ imbalance in the frequency domain, the above equation can be rewritten as:
$$\begin{alignat}{3}
\tilde{x}(t) & =\tilde{x}_I(t)+j\tilde{x}_Q(t) \\[6pt]
& =[\cos(\varepsilon_\theta/2)+j\varepsilon_A\sin(\varepsilon_\theta/2)]x(t)+[\varepsilon_A\cos(\varepsilon_\theta/2)-j\sin(\varepsilon_\theta/2)]x^*(t) \\[6pt]
& =\eta_\alpha x(t)+\eta_\beta x^*(t)
\end{alignat}$$
where $x^*$ denotes the complex conjugate of $x$. In an OFDM system, the base-band signal consists of several sub-carriers. Complex-conjugating the base-band signal of the kth sub-carrier carrying data $X_k$ is identical to carrying $X^*_k$ on the $(-k)$th sub-carrier:
$$((X_{k,I}+jX_{k,Q})e^{j2\pi kf_St})^*=(X_{k,I}-jX_{k,Q})e^{-j2\pi kf_St}=X^*_ke^{j2\pi(-k)f_St}$$
where $f_S$ is the sub-carrier spacing. Equivalently, the received base-band OFDM signal under the IQ imbalance effect is given by:
$$\tilde{X}_k=\eta_\alpha X_k+\eta_\beta X^*_{-k}$$
In conclusion, besides a complex gain imposed on the current sub-carrier data $X_k$, IQ imbalance also introduces Inter Carrier Interference (ICI) from the adjacent carrier or sub-carrier. The ICI term makes OFDM receivers very sensitive to IQ imbalances. To solve this problem, the designer can request a stringent specification of the matching of the two branches in the frond-end or compensate for the imbalance in the base-band receiver. On the other hand, a digital Odd-Order I/Q-demodulator with only one input can be used, but such design has a bandwidth limitation.

== Simulation ==
IQ imbalance can be simulated by computing the gain and phase imbalance and applying them to the base-band signal by means of several real multipliers and adders.

== Synchronization errors ==
The time domain base-band signals with IQ imbalance can be represented by
$$z_{i,n} = \eta_\alpha z(t)+\eta_\beta z^*(t)\Bigg|_{t\,=\,i(N\,+\,N\,\mid\, g)T_s\,+\,N_gT_s\,+\, nT_s}$$
Note that $\eta_\alpha$ and $\eta_\beta$ can be assumed to be time-invariant and frequency-invariant, meaning that they are constant over several sub carriers and symbols. With this property, multiple OFDM sub-carriers and symbols can be used to jointly estimate $\eta_\alpha$ and $\eta_\beta$ to increase the accuracy. Transforming to the frequency domain, we have the frequency domain OFDM signals under the influence of IQ imbalance given by:
$$z_{i,k}=\eta_\alpha H_{i,k}X_{i,k}+\eta_\beta H^*_{i,-k}X^*_{i,-k}+V_{i,k}$$
Note that the second term represents interference coming from the mirrored sub-carrier $X_{i,-k}$

== IQ imbalance estimation in MIMO-OFDM systems ==
In MIMO-OFDM systems, each RF channel has its own down-converting circuit. Therefore, the IQ imbalance for each RF channel is independent of those for the other RF channels. Considering a $2 \times 2$ MIMO system as an example, the received frequency domain signal is given by:
$$\begin{cases}
Z^{(0)}_{i,k} & =\eta^{(0)}_\alpha (H^{(0,0)}_{i,k}X^{(0)}_{i,k}+H^{(0,1)}_{i,k}X^{(1)}_{i,k})+\eta^{(0)}_\beta (H^{(0,0)}_{i,-k}X^{(0)}_{i,-k}+H^{(0,1)}_{i,-k}X^{(1)}_{i,-k})^*+V^{(0)}_{i,k}\\[6pt]
Z^{(1)}_{i,k} & =\eta^{(1)}_\alpha (H^{(1,0)}_{i,k}X^{(0)}_{i,k}+H^{(1,1)}_{i,k}X^{(1)}_{i,k})+\eta^{(1)}_\beta (H^{(1,0)}_{i,-k}X^{(0)}_{i,-k}+H^{(1,1)}_{i,-k}X^{(1)}_{i,-k})^*+V^{(1)}_{i,k}
\end{cases}$$
where $\eta^{(q)}_\alpha$ and $\eta^{(q)}_\beta$ are the IQ imbalance coefficients of the qth receive RF channel. Estimation of $\eta^{(q)}_\alpha$ and $\eta^{(q)}_\beta$ is the same for each RF channel. Therefore, we take the first RF channel as an example. The received signals at the pilot sub-carriers of the first RF channel are stacked into a vector $z^{(q)}_{i,\alpha}$,

$$\mathbf{z}^{(0)}_{i,\alpha }=
\begin{bmatrix}
z^{(0)}_{i,\alpha 0} \\
z^{(0)}_{i,\alpha 1} \\
\vdots               \\
z^{(0)}_{i,\alpha J-1}
\end{bmatrix}
=\mathbf{A}^{(0)}_{i,\alpha}
\begin{bmatrix}
\eta^{(0)}_\alpha      \\
\eta^{(0)}_\beta
\end{bmatrix}
+\mathbf{v}^{(0)}_{i,\alpha},$$
where $\mathbf{A}^{(0)}_{i,\alpha}$ is the $\mathbf{J}\times 2$ matrix defined by:
$$\mathbf{A}^{(0)}_{i,\alpha}=
\begin{bmatrix}
(H^{(0,0)}_{i,\alpha 0}X^{(0)}_{i,\alpha 0}+H^{(0,1)}_{i,\alpha 0}X^{(1)}_{i,\alpha 0})&
(H^{(0,0)}_{i,\alpha _{J-1}}X^{(0)}_{i,\alpha _{J-1}}+H^{(0,1)}_{i,\alpha _{J-1}}X^{(1)}_{i,\alpha _{J-1}})^*\\
(H^{(0,0)}_{i,\alpha 1}X^{(0)}_{i,\alpha 1}+H^{(0,1)}_{i,\alpha 1}X^{(1)}_{i,\alpha 1})&
(H^{(0,0)}_{i,\alpha _{J-2}}X^{(0)}_{i,\alpha _{J-2}}+H^{(0,1)}_{i,\alpha _{J-2}}X^{(1)}_{i,\alpha _{J-2}})^*\\
\vdots &\vdots \\
(H^{(0,0)}_{i,\alpha_{J-1}}X^{(0)}_{i,\alpha _{J-1}}+H^{(0,1)}_{i,\alpha _{J-1}}X^{(1)}_{i,\alpha _{J-1}})&
(H^{(0,0)}_{i,\alpha _{0}}X^{(0)}_{i,\alpha _{0}}+H^{(0,1)}_{i,\alpha _{0}}X^{(1)}_{i,\alpha _{0}})^*
\end{bmatrix}$$

Clearly, the above formula is similar to that of the SISO case and can be solved using the LS method. Moreover, the estimation complexity can be reduced by using fewer pilot sub-carriers in the estimation.

== IQ imbalance compensation ==
The IQ imbalance can be compensated in either the time domain or the frequency domain. In the time domain, the compensated signal $Z_m$ in the current mth sample point is given by:
$$\overline{z}_m=\frac{\widehat{\eta}^*_\alpha z_m-\widehat{\eta}_\beta z^*_m}{|\widehat{\eta}_\alpha|^2-|\widehat{\eta}_\beta|^2}=\frac{\widehat{\eta}^*_\alpha}{|\widehat{\eta}_\alpha|^2-|\widehat{\eta}^*_\beta|^2}(z_m-\frac{\widehat{\eta}_\beta}{\widehat{\eta}^*_\alpha}z^*_m)$$
We can see that, by using the ratio $\widehat{\eta}_\beta/\widehat{\eta}^*_\alpha$ to mitigate the IQ imbalance, there is a loss factor $\widehat{\eta}^*_\alpha/(|\widehat{\eta}_\alpha|^2-|\widehat{\eta}_\beta|^2)$. When the noise is added before the IQ imbalance, the SNR remains the same, because both noise and signal suffer this loss. However, if the noise is added after IQ imbalance, the effective SNR degrades. In this case, $\eta_\alpha$ and $\eta_\beta$, respectively, should be computed. Compared with the time domain approach, compensating in the frequency domain is more complicated because the mirrored sub-carrier is needed. The frequency domain compensated signal at the ith symbol and the kth sub-carrier:
$$\overline{Z}_{i,k}=\frac{\widehat{\eta}^*_\alpha Z_{i,k}-\widehat{\eta}_\beta Z^*_{i,k}}{|\widehat{\eta}_\alpha|^2-|\widehat{\eta}_\beta|^2}$$
Nevertheless, in reality, the time domain compensation is less preferred because it introduces larger latency between IQ imbalance estimation and compensation.

== IQ imbalance estimation ==
Frequency domain OFDM signals under the influence of IQ imbalance is given by:
$$z_{i,k}=\eta_\alpha H_{i,k}X_{i,k}+\eta_\beta H^*_{i,-k}X^*_{i,-k}+V_{i,k}$$
The IQ imbalance coefficients $\eta_\alpha$ and $\eta_\beta$ are mixed with the channel frequency responses, making both the IQ imbalance estimation and channel estimation difficult. In the first half of the training sequence, only sub-carriers ranging from $1$ to N/2 − 1 transmit pilot symbols; the remaining sub-carriers are not used. In the second half, the sub-carriers from −1 to −N/2 are used for pilot transmission. Such a training scheme easily decouples the IQ imbalance and the channel frequency response. Assuming the value of the pilot symbols is +1, the received signals at sub-carriers from 1 to N/2 − 1 are given by $Z_{i,k}=\eta_\alpha H_{i,k}+V_{i,k}, \; \forall k=1,\ldots,N/2-1$, while the received signals at the mirrored sub-carriers take the form $Z_{i,-k}=\eta_\beta H^*_{i,k}+V_{i,-k}, \; \forall k=1,\ldots, N/2-1$.

From the two sets of received signals, the ratio $\eta_\beta/\eta^*_\alpha$ can be easily estimated by $Z_{i,-k}/Z^*_{i,k}$. The second half of the training sequence can be used in a similar way. Furthermore, the accuracy of this ratio estimation can be improved by averaging over several training symbols and several sub-carriers. Although the IQ imbalance estimation using this training symbol is simple, this method suffers from low spectrum efficiency, as quite a few OFDM symbols must be reserved for training. Note that, when the thermal noise is added before the IQ imbalance, the ratio $\eta_\beta/\eta^*_\alpha$ is sufficient to compensate the IQ imbalance. However, when the noise is added after the IQ imbalance, compensation using only $\eta_\beta/\eta^*_\alpha$ can degrade the ensuing demodulation performance.
