= In-phase and quadrature components =

Mathematical technique for manipulating signals

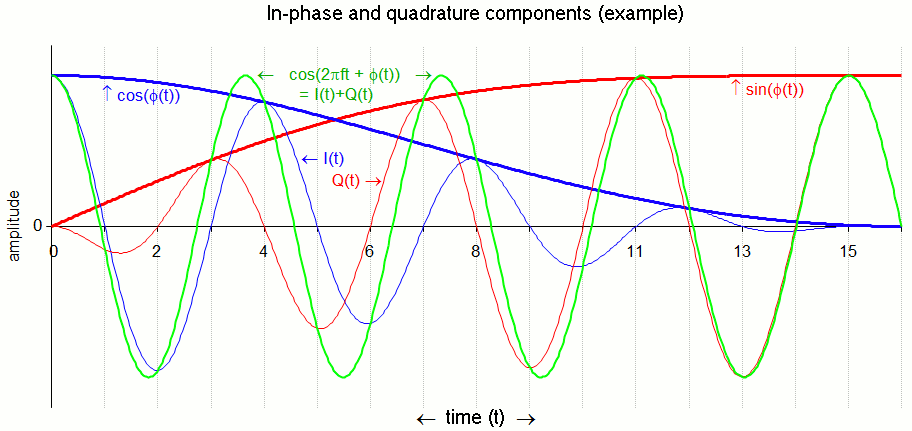
Graphic example of the formula ${\color{Green}\cos(2\pi ft + \varphi(t))}\ =$ ${\color{Blue}\cos(2\pi ft)\cos(\varphi(t))}\ +\ {\color{Red}\cos(2\pi ft + \pi/2)\sin(\varphi(t))}.$ The phase modulation (φ(t), not shown) is a non-linearly increasing function from 0 to π/2 over the interval 0 < t < 16. The two amplitude-modulated components are known as the in-phase component (I, thin blue, decreasing) and the quadrature component (Q, thin red, increasing).

A sinusoid with modulation can be decomposed into, or synthesized from, two amplitude-modulated sinusoids that are in quadrature phase, i.e., with a phase offset of one-quarter cycle (90 degrees or π/2 radians). All three sinusoids have the same center frequency. The two amplitude-modulated sinusoids are known as the in-phase (I) and quadrature (Q) components, which describes their relationships with the amplitude- and phase-modulated carrier. (Note: The low-frequency modulating waveforms are also referred to as the I and Q components.)

Or in other words, it is possible to create an arbitrarily phase-shifted sine wave, by mixing together in different proportions two sine waves that are 90° out of phase.

The implication is that the modulations in some signal can be treated separately from the carrier wave of the signal. This has extensive use in many radio and signal processing applications. I/Q data is used to represent the modulations of some carrier, independent of that carrier's frequency.

== Orthogonality ==
In vector analysis, a vector with polar coordinates A, φ and Cartesian coordinates x = A cos(φ), y = A sin(φ), can be represented as the sum of orthogonal components: [x, 0] + [0, y]. Similarly in trigonometry, the angle sum identity expresses:

sin(x + φ) = sin(x) cos(φ) + sin(x + π/2) sin(φ).

And in functional analysis, when x is a linear function of some variable, such as time, these components are sinusoids, and they are orthogonal functions. A phase-shift of x → x + π/2 changes the identity to:

cos(x + φ) = cos(x) cos(φ) + cos(x + π/2) sin(φ),

in which case cos(x) cos(φ) is the in-phase component. In both conventions cos(φ) is the in-phase amplitude modulation, which explains why some authors refer to it as the actual in-phase component.

== Narrowband signal model ==
In an angle modulation application, with carrier frequency f, φ is also a time-variant function, giving:

$$\begin{align}
A(t)\cdot\cos[2\pi ft + \varphi(t)]\ &= \cos(2\pi ft)\cdot A(t)\cos[\varphi(t)] \
+\ \cos\left(2\pi ft + \tfrac \pi 2 \right) \cdot A(t)\sin[\varphi(t)]\\[8pt]
&=\underbrace{ \cos(2\pi ft)\cdot A(t)\cos[\varphi(t)]}_{\text {in-phase}} \
\underbrace{\ -\ \sin(2\pi ft)\cdot A(t)\sin[\varphi(t)]}_{\text {quadrature}}.
\end{align}$$

Eq.1

When all three terms above are multiplied by an optional amplitude function, A(t) > 0, the left-hand side of the equality is known as the amplitude/phase form, and the right-hand side is the quadrature-carrier or IQ form. (Note: The negative sign in Eq.1 can be associated with either the quadrature carrier or its amplitude modulation. In the former case, Q-carrier leads I-carrier by $\tfrac{1}{4}$ cycle. Otherwise, it lags by $\tfrac{1}{4}$ cycle. The distinction is not important, but it can be confusing.) Because of the modulation, the components are no longer completely orthogonal functions. But when A(t) and φ(t) are slowly varying functions compared to 2πft, the assumption of orthogonality is a common one. (Note: Orthogonality is important in many applications, including demodulation, direction-finding, and bandpass sampling.) Authors often call it a narrowband assumption, or a narrowband signal model.

== I/Q data ==
A stream of information about how to amplitude-modulate the I and Q phases of a sine wave is known as the I/Q data. By just amplitude-modulating these two 90°-out-of-phase sine waves and adding them, it is possible to produce the effect of arbitrarily modulating some carrier: amplitude and phase.

A phasor for I/Q, and the resultant wave which is continually phase shifting, according to the phasor's frequency. Note that since this resultant wave is continuously phase shifting at a steady rate, effectively the frequency has been changed: it has been frequency modulated.

And if the I/Q data itself has some frequency (e.g. a phasor) then the carrier also can be frequency modulated. So I/Q data is a complete representation of how a carrier is modulated: amplitude, phase and frequency.

For received signals, by determining how much in-phase carrier and how much quadrature carrier is present in the signal it is possible to represent that signal using in-phase and quadrature components, so I/Q data can be generated from a signal with reference to a carrier sine wave.

IQ modulation and demodulation. LO is the local oscillator - the carrier sine wave being modulated I(t) and Q(t) are the time-series data for the in-phase and quadrature components. S is transmitted and received signal

I/Q data has extensive use in many signal processing contexts, including for radio modulation, software-defined radio, audio signal processing and electrical engineering.

I/Q data is a two-dimensional stream. Some sources treat I/Q as a complex number; with the I and Q components corresponding to the real and imaginary parts, respectively. Others treat it as distinct pairs of values, as a 2D vector, or as separate streams.

When called "I/Q data" the information is likely digital. However, I/Q may be represented as analog signals. The concepts are applicable to both the analog and digital representations of I/Q.

This technique of using I/Q data to represent the modulations of a signal separate to the signal's frequency is known as equivalent baseband signal, supported by the § Narrowband signal model. It is sometimes referred to as vector modulation.

The data rate of I/Q is largely independent to the frequency of the signal being modulated. I/Q data can be generated at a relatively slow rate (e.g. millions of bits per second), perhaps generated by software in part of the physical layer of a protocol stack. I/Q data is used to modulate a carrier frequency, which may be faster (e.g. Gigahertz, perhaps an intermediate frequency).

As well as within a transmitter, I/Q data is also a common means to represent the signal from some receiver. Designs such as the Digital down converter allow the input signal to be represented as streams of I/Q data, likely for further processing and symbol extraction in a DSP. Analog systems may suffer from issues, such as IQ imbalance.

I/Q data may also be used as a means to capture and store data used in spectrum monitoring. Since I/Q allows the representation of the modulation separate to the actual carrier frequency, it is possible to represent a capture of all the radio traffic in some RF band or section thereof, with a reasonable amount of data, irrespective of the frequency being monitored. E.g. if there is a capture of 100 MHz of Wi-Fi channels within the 5 GHz U-NII band, that I/Q capture can be sampled at 200 million samples per second (according to Nyquist) as opposed to the 10,000 million samples per second required to sample directly at 5 GHz.

A vector signal generator will typically use I/Q data alongside some programmed frequency to generate its signal. And similarly a vector signal analyser can provide a stream of I/Q data in its output. Many modulation schemes, e.g. quadrature amplitude modulation rely heavily on I/Q.

== Alternating current (AC) circuits ==
The term alternating current applies to a voltage vs. time function that is sinusoidal with a frequency f. When it is applied to a typical (linear time-invariant) circuit or device, it causes a current that is also sinusoidal. In general there is a constant phase difference φ between any two sinusoids. The input sinusoidal voltage is usually defined to have zero phase, meaning that it is arbitrarily chosen as a convenient time reference. So the phase difference is attributed to the current function, e.g. sin(2πft + φ), whose orthogonal components are sin(2πft) cos(φ) and sin(2πft + π/2) sin(φ), as we have seen. When φ happens to be such that the in-phase component is zero, the current and voltage sinusoids are said to be in quadrature, which means they are orthogonal to each other. In that case, no average (active) electrical power is consumed. Rather power is temporarily stored by the device and given back, once every 1/2f seconds. Note that the term in quadrature only implies that two sinusoids are orthogonal, not that they are components of another sinusoid.

When a sinusoidal voltage is applied to either a simple capacitor or inductor, the resultant current that flows is "in quadrature" with the voltage.

IQ phasor diagram

== See also ==
- Analytic signal – Particular representation of a signal
- IQ imbalance – Problem affecting a class of radio receivers
- Constellation diagram – Signal representation
- Negative frequency – Indication of rate and sense of rotation
- Phasor – Complex number representing a particular sine wave
- Polar modulation – Modulation allowing for multiple signals on a line
- Quadrature amplitude modulation – Family of digital modulation methods
- Single-sideband modulation – Electronic method of transmitting information with a carrier wave
