= Quadrature filter =

In signal processing, a quadrature filter $q(t)$ is the analytic representation of the impulse response $f(t)$ of a real-valued filter:

$q(t) = f_{a}(t) = \left(\delta(t) + j\delta(jt) \right) * f(t)$

If the quadrature filter $q(t)$ is applied to a signal $s(t)$, the result is

$$h(t) = (q * s)(t) = \left(\delta(t) + j\delta(jt)\right) * f(t) * s(t)$$

which implies that $h(t)$ is the analytic representation of $(f * s)(t)$.

Since $q$ is an analytic signal, it is either zero or complex-valued. In practice, therefore, $q$ is often implemented as two real-valued filters, which correspond to the real and imaginary parts of the filter, respectively.

An ideal quadrature filter cannot have a finite support. It has single sided support, but by choosing the (analog) function $f(t)$ carefully, it is possible to design quadrature filters which are localized such that they can be approximated by means of functions of finite support. A digital realization without feedback (FIR) has finite support.

== Applications ==
This construction will simply assemble an analytic signal with a starting point to finally create a causal signal with finite energy. The two Delta Distributions will perform this operation. This will impose an additional constraint on the filter.

=== Single frequency signals ===
For single frequency signals (in practice narrow bandwidth signals) with frequency $\omega$ the magnitude of the response of a quadrature filter equals the signal's amplitude A times the frequency function of the filter at frequency $\omega$.

$$h(t) = (s * q)(t) = \frac{1}{\pi} \int_{0}^{\infty} S(u) Q(u) e^{i u t} du =
\frac{1}{\pi} \int_{0}^{\infty} A \pi \delta(u - \omega)
Q(u) e^{i u t} du =$$

$$= A \int_{0}^{\infty} \delta(u - \omega) Q(u) e^{i u t} du =
A Q(\omega) e^{i \omega t}$$

$$|h(t)| = A |Q(\omega)|$$

This property can be useful when the signal s is a narrow-bandwidth signal of unknown frequency. By choosing a suitable frequency function Q of the filter, we may generate known functions of the unknown frequency $\omega$ which then can be estimated.

== See also ==
- Analytic signal
- Hilbert transform
