= Hilbert spectroscopy =

Hilbert Spectroscopy uses Hilbert transforms to analyze broad spectrum signals from gigahertz to terahertz frequency radio. One suggested use is to quickly analyze liquids inside airport passenger luggage.
