= Baseband =

Range of frequencies occupied by an unmodulated signal

Spectrum of a baseband signal, energy E per unit frequency as a function of frequency f. The total energy is the area under the curve.

In telecommunications and signal processing, baseband is the range of frequencies occupied by a signal that has not been modulated to higher frequencies. Baseband signals typically originate from transducers, converting some other variable into an electrical signal. For example, the electronic output of a microphone is a baseband signal that is analogous to the applied voice audio. In conventional analog radio broadcasting, the baseband audio signal is used to modulate an RF carrier signal of a much higher frequency.

A baseband signal may have frequency components going all the way down to the DC bias, or at least it will have a high ratio bandwidth. A modulated baseband signal is called a passband signal. This occupies a higher range of frequencies and has a lower ratio and fractional bandwidth.

== Various uses ==
=== Baseband signal ===
A baseband signal or lowpass signal is a signal that can include frequencies that are very near zero, by comparison with its highest frequency (for example, a sound waveform can be considered as a baseband signal, whereas a radio signal or any other modulated signal is not).

A baseband bandwidth is equal to the highest frequency of a signal or system, or an upper bound on such frequencies, for example the upper cut-off frequency of a low-pass filter. By contrast, passband bandwidth is the difference between a highest frequency and a nonzero lowest frequency.

=== Baseband channel ===
A baseband channel or lowpass channel (or system, or network) is a communication channel that can transfer frequencies that are very near zero. Examples are serial cables and local area networks (LANs), as opposed to passband channels such as radio frequency channels and passband filtered wires of the analog telephone network. Frequency division multiplexing (FDM) allows an analog telephone wire to carry a baseband telephone call, concurrently as one or several carrier-modulated telephone calls.

=== Digital baseband transmission ===
Digital baseband transmission, also known as line coding, aims at transferring a digital bit stream over baseband channel, typically an unfiltered wire, contrary to passband transmission, also known as carrier-modulated transmission. Passband transmission makes communication possible over a bandpass filtered channel, such as the telephone network local-loop or a band-limited wireless channel.

==== Baseband transmission in Ethernet ====
The word "BASE" in Ethernet physical layer standards, for example 10BASE5, 100BASE-TX and 1000BASE-SX, implies baseband digital transmission (i.e. that a line code and an unfiltered wire are used).

=== Baseband processor ===
A baseband processor also known as BP or BBP is used to process the down-converted digital signal to retrieve essential data for a wireless digital system. The baseband processing block in GNSS receivers is responsible for providing observable data: that is, code pseudo-ranges and carrier phase measurements, as well as navigation data.

=== Equivalent baseband signal ===
On the left is a part of the transmitter, which will take in a stream of baseband IQ data, and use this to amplitude modulate a Local Oscillator's signal, both the standard sine wave from the LO, and also a version which phase shifted by 90° (in-phase and quadrature) - these modulated signals are combined, to form the Intermediate frequency IF representation. In a typical transmitter, the IF would get up-converted, filtered, amplified, then transmitted from an antenna. (These are not shown) On the right we see an aspect of the receiver. After some low-noise amplification, filtering and down-conversion (not shown) to an IF, the signal is mixed with the in-phase sine from the LO, and also the quadrature version of the LO, giving a complex (or 2-dimensional) representation of the signal. This IQ data could then be supplied to a digital signal processor to extract symbols or data.

An equivalent baseband signal or equivalent lowpass signal is a complex valued representation of the modulated physical signal (the so-called passband signal or RF signal). It is a concept within analog and digital modulation methods for (passband) signals with constant or varying carrier frequency (for example ASK, PSK QAM, and FSK). The equivalent baseband signal is $Z(t)=I(t)+jQ(t)\,$ where $I(t)$ is the inphase signal, $Q(t)$ the quadrature phase signal, and $j$ the imaginary unit. This signal is sometimes called IQ data. In a digital modulation method, the $I(t)$ and $Q(t)$ signals of each modulation symbol are evident from the constellation diagram. The frequency spectrum of this signal includes negative as well as positive frequencies. The physical passband signal corresponds to

$$I(t)\cos(\omega t) - Q(t)\sin(\omega t) = \mathrm{Re}\{Z(t)e^{j\omega t}\}\,$$

where $\omega$ is the carrier angular frequency in rad/s.

== Modulation ==
A signal at baseband is often used to modulate a higher frequency carrier signal in order that it may be transmitted via radio. Modulation results in shifting the signal up to much higher frequencies (radio frequencies, or RF) than it originally spanned. A key consequence of the usual double-sideband amplitude modulation (AM) is that the range of frequencies the signal spans (its spectral bandwidth) is doubled. Thus, the RF bandwidth of a signal (measured from the lowest frequency as opposed to 0 Hz) is twice its baseband bandwidth. Steps may be taken to reduce this effect, such as single-sideband modulation. Conversely, some transmission schemes such as frequency modulation use even more bandwidth.

The figure below shows AM modulation:

Comparison of the equivalent baseband version of a signal and its AM-modulated (double-sideband) RF version, showing the typical doubling of the occupied bandwidth.

== See also ==
- Complex envelope
- Broadband
- In-phase and quadrature components
- Narrowband
- Wideband
