= Underwater acoustic communication =

Wireless technique of sending and receiving messages through water

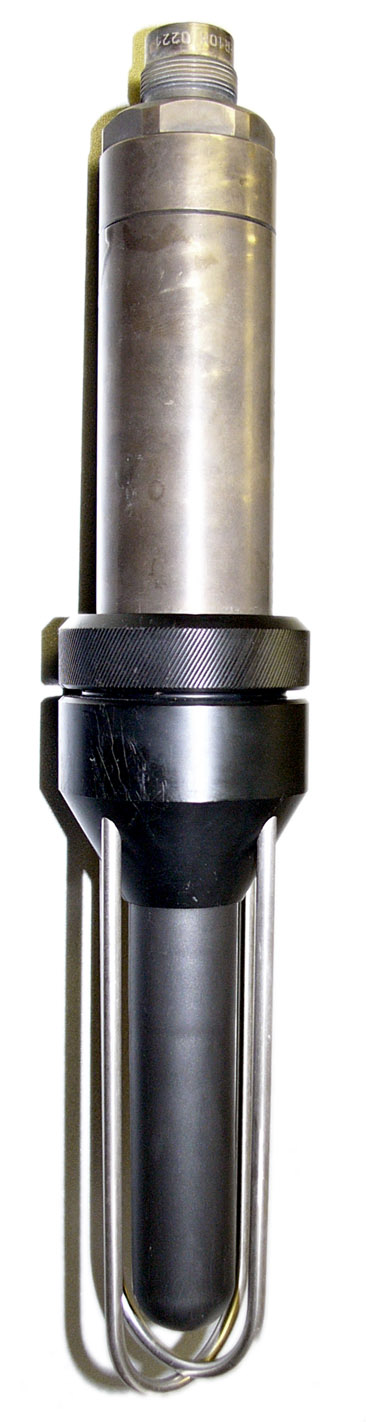
Underwater-microphone

Underwater acoustic communication is a technique of sending and receiving messages in water. There are several ways of employing such communication but the most common is by using hydrophones. Underwater communication is difficult due to factors such as multi-path propagation, time variations of the channel, small available bandwidth and strong signal attenuation, especially over long ranges. Compared to terrestrial communication, underwater communication has low data rates because it uses acoustic waves instead of electromagnetic waves.

At the beginning of the 20th century some ships communicated by underwater bells as well as using the system for navigation. Submarine signals were at the time competitive with the primitive maritime radionavigation. The later Fessenden oscillator allowed communication with submarines.

== Types of modulation used for underwater acoustic communications ==
In general the modulation methods developed for radio communications can be adapted for underwater acoustic communications (UAC). However some of the modulation schemes are more suited to the unique underwater acoustic communication channel than others. Some of the modulation methods used for UAC are as follows:

- Frequency-shift keying (FSK)
- Phase-shift keying (PSK)
- Frequency-hopping spread spectrum (FHSS)
- Direct-sequence spread spectrum (DSSS)
- Frequency and pulse-position modulation (FPPM and PPM)
- Multiple frequency-shift keying (MFSK)
- Orthogonal frequency-division multiplexing (OFDM)
- Continuous Phase Modulation (CPM)

The following is a discussion on the different types of modulation and their utility to UAC.

=== Frequency-shift keying ===
FSK is the earliest form of modulation used for acoustic modems. FSK usually employs two distinct frequencies to modulate data; for example, frequency F1 to indicate bit 0 and frequency F2 to indicate bit 1. Hence a binary string can be transmitted by alternating these two frequencies depending on whether it is a 0 or 1. The receiver can be as simple as having analogue matched filters to the two frequencies and a level detector to decide if a 1 or 0 was received. This is a relatively easy form of modulation and therefore used in the earliest acoustic modems. However more sophisticated demodulator using digital signal processors (DSP) can be used in the present day.

The biggest challenge FSK faces in the UAC is multi-path reflections. With multi-path (particularly in UAC) several strong reflections can be present at the receiving hydrophone and the threshold detectors become confused, thus severely limiting the use of this type of UAC to vertical channels. Adaptive equalization methods have been tried with limited success. Adaptive equalization tries to model the highly reflective UAC channel and subtract the effects from the received signal. The success has been limited due to the rapidly varying conditions and the difficulty to adapt in time.

=== Phase-shift keying ===
Phase-shift keying (PSK) is a digital modulation scheme that conveys data by changing (modulating) the phase of a reference signal (the carrier wave). The signal is impressed into the magnetic field x,y area by varying the sine and cosine inputs at a precise time. It is widely used for wireless LANs , RFID and Bluetooth communication.

=== Orthogonal frequency-division multiplexing ===
Orthogonal frequency-division multiplexing (OFDM) is a digital multi-carrier modulation scheme. OFDM conveys data on several parallel data channels by incorporating closely spaced orthogonal sub-carrier signals.

OFDM is a favorable communication scheme in underwater acoustic communications thanks to its resilience against frequency selective channels with long delay spreads.

=== Continuous phase modulation ===
Continuous phase modulation (CPM) is a modulation technique, which is a continuous phase shift, where the phase of the carrier signal varies over time and avoids abrupt changes between successive symbols. This smooth phase trajectory reduces spectral side lobes.

Reducing spectral side lobes increases the spectral efficiency of CPM and enables it to transmit data within a narrower bandwidth. Notable variants of CPM include minimum shift keying (MSK) and Gaussian minimum shift keying (GMSK), which uses a Gaussian filter to smooth out phase shifts.

Since the underwater environment is highly scattered, it can cause multipath propagation and signal degradation. The CPM's continuous phase feature mitigates these effects and maintains signal integrity. Besides its high spectral efficiency helps make optimal use of limited bandwidth underwater.

== Use of vector sensors ==
Compared to a scalar pressure sensor, such as a hydrophone, which measures the scalar acoustic field component, a vector sensor measures the vector field components such as acoustic particle velocities. Vector sensors can be categorized into inertial and gradient sensors.

Vector sensors have been widely researched over the past few decades. Many vector sensor signal processing algorithms have been designed.

Underwater vector sensor applications have been focused on sonar and target detection. They have also been proposed to be used as underwater multi‐channel communication receivers and equalizers. Other researchers have used arrays of scalar sensors as multi‐channel equalizers and receivers.

== Applications ==
=== Underwater telephone ===
The underwater telephone, also known as UQC, AN/WQC-2, or Gertrude, was used by the U.S. Navy in 1945 after in Kiel, Germany, in 1935 different realizations at sea were demonstrated. The terms UQC and AN/WQC-2 follow the nomenclature of the Joint Electronics Type Designation System. The type designation "UQC" stands for General Utility (multi use), Sonar and Underwater Sound and Communications (Receiving/Transmitting, two way). The "W" in WQC stands for Water Surface and Underwater combined. The underwater telephone is used on all crewed submersibles and many Naval surface ships in operation. Voice or an audio tone (morse code) communicated through the UQC are heterodyned to a high pitch for acoustic transmission through water.

==== Scuba diving communications ====
Acoustic technology, although used in scuba diving for communication, has lower range and transmission range than radio transmission. It is considered suboptimal for large or high-interference areas.

=== JANUS ===
In April 2017, NATO's Centre for Maritime Research and Experimentation announced the approval of JANUS, a standardized protocol to transmit digital information underwater using acoustic sound (like modems and fax machines do over telephone lines). Documented in STANAG 4748, it uses 900 Hz to 60 kHz frequencies at distances of up to 28 kilometres (17 mi). It is available for use with military and civilian, NATO and non-NATO devices; it was named after the Roman god of gateways, openings, etc.

The JANUS specification (ANEP-87) provides for a flexible plug-in-based payload scheme. A baseline JANUS packet consists of 64 bits to which further arbitrary data (Cargo) can be appended. This enables multiple different applications such as Emergency location, Underwater AIS (Automatic Identification System), and Chat. An example of an Emergency Position and Status message can be written as the following JSON representation (the actual packet is in an efficient binary format):

{
    "ClassUserID": 0,
    "ApplicationType": 3,
    "Nationality": "PT",
    "Latitude": "38.386547",  // internally in units of 90/8388607 degrees
    "Longitude": "-9.055858", // ditto
    "Depth": "16",    // internally an integer, meters
    "Speed": "1.4",   // internally in units of 0.1 knots
    "Heading": "0.0", // internally in units of 0.705 degrees
    "O2": "17.8",     // internally in units of 0.1% (17%-23.3%)
    "CO2": "5.0",     // internally in units of 0.1% (0-6.3%)
    "CO": "76",       // internally in units of 1 ppm
    "H2": "3.5",      // internally in units of 0.1% (0-6.3%)
    "Pressure": "45.0",    // internally in units of 0.1 bar (0.9-103.2 bar)
    "Temperature": "21.0", // internally in units of 1 celsius (0-63 deg C)
    "Survivors": "43",     // 0-255
    "MobilityFlag": "1",          // rows starting here are "baseline message" content, as are ClassUserID and ApplicationType. 1 = mobile
    "ForwardingCapability": "1",  // Used for routing
    "TxRxFlag": "0",              // 0 = transmit-only; 1 = bidirectional able
    "ScheduleFlag": "0"
}

This Emergency Position and Status Message (Class ID 0 Application 3 Plug-in) message shows a Portuguese submarine at 38.386547 latitude -9.055858 longitude at a depth of 16 meters. It is moving north at 1.4 knots, and has 43 survivors on board and shows the environmental conditions.

=== Underwater messaging ===
Commercial hardware products have been designed to enable two-way underwater messaging between scuba divers. These support sending from a list of pre-defined messages from a dive computer using acoustic communication.

Research efforts have also explored the use of smartphones in water-proof cases for underwater communication, using acoustic modem hardware as phone attachments as well as using a software app without any additional hardware. The Android software app, AquaApp, from University of Washington uses the microphones and speakers on existing smartphones and smart watches to enable underwater acoustic communication. It had been tested to send digital messages using smartphones between divers at distances of up to 100 m.

Acoustic underwater messaging was called "one of the most difficult communication media in use today" by a paper published in IEEE, which stated that due to the relatively slower speed of sound (1500 meters per second) and doppler effect while moving, it is difficult to use.

== See also ==
- Acoustic communication in aquatic animals
- Acoustic communication in fish
- Telecommunications
- Acoustic release – Oceanographic device recovery method
- Underwater acoustics – Study of the propagation of sound in water
