= Stress wave communication =

Stress wave communication is a technique of sending and receiving messages using host structure itself as the transmission medium. Conventional modulation methods such as amplitude-shift keying (ASK), frequency-shift keying (FSK), phase-shift keying (PSK), quadrature amplitude modulation (QAM), pulse-position modulation (PPM) and orthogonal frequency-division multiplexing (OFDM) could be leveraged for stress wave communication. The challenge to use stress wave as the carrier of the communication is the severe signal distortions due to the multipath channel dispersion. Compared with other communication techniques, it is a very reliable communication for special applications, such as within concrete structures, well drilling string, pipeline structures and so on.
