= Data communication =

Transfer of data over a communication channel

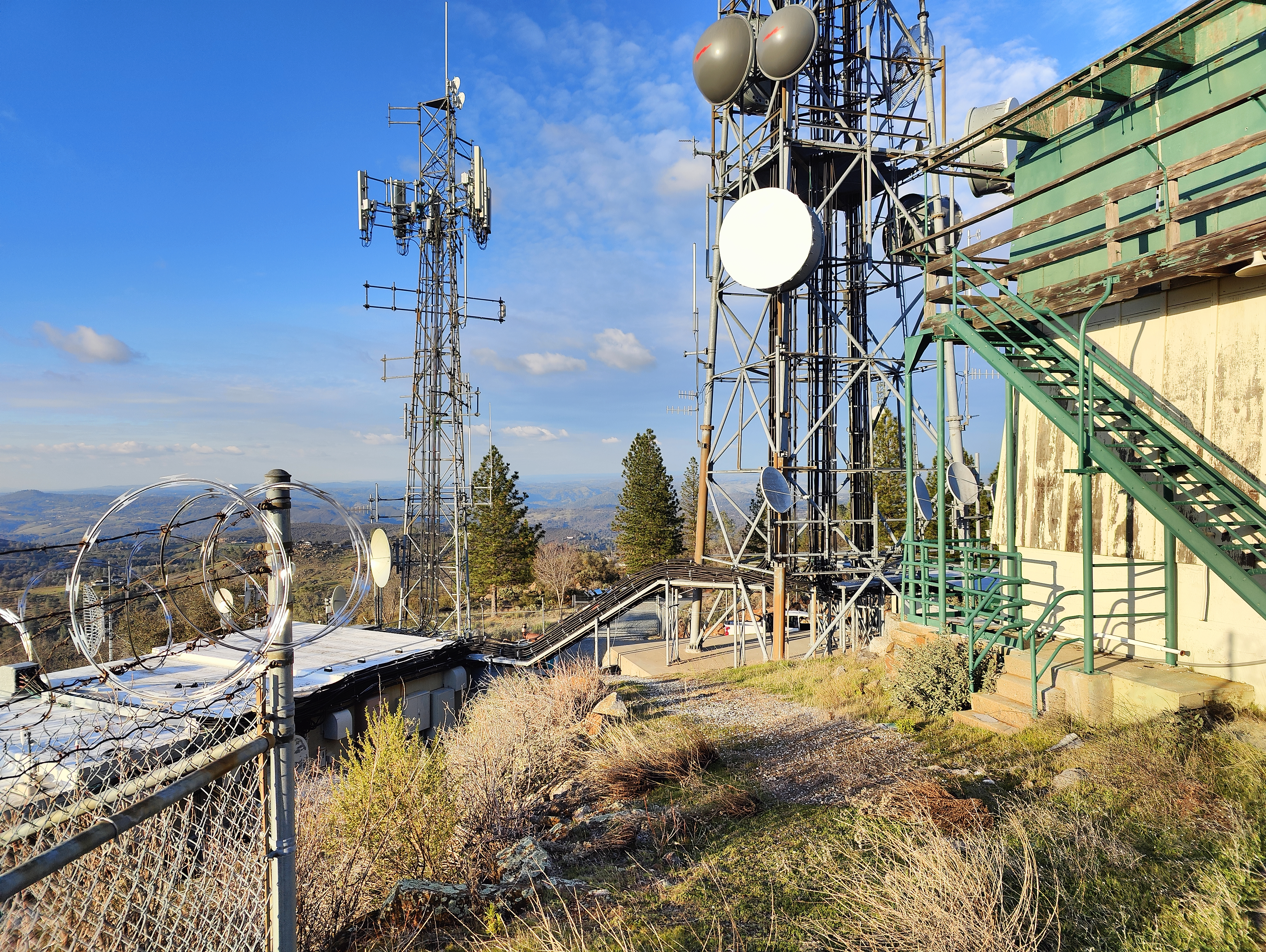
Radio towers at Pine Hill lookout

Data communication is the transfer of data over a point-to-point or point-to-multipoint communication channel. Data communication comprises data transmission and data reception and can be classified as analog transmission and digital communications.

Analog data communication conveys voice, data, image, signal or video information using a continuous signal, which varies in amplitude, phase, or some other property. In baseband analog transmission, messages are represented by a sequence of pulses by means of a line code; in passband analog transmission, they are communicated by a limited set of continuously varying waveforms, using a digital modulation method. Passband modulation and demodulation are carried out by modem equipment.

Digital transmission and digital reception are the transfer of either a digitized analog signal or a born-digital bitstream. Baseband digital transmission is regarded as comprising part of a digital signal, whereas passband transmission of digital data may also or alternatively be considered a form of digital-to-analog conversion.

Data communication channels include copper wires, optical fibers, Wireless communication using radio spectrum, storage media and computer buses. The data are represented as an electromagnetic signal, such as an electrical voltage, radiowave, microwave, or infrared signal.

== Distinction between related subjects ==
Digital transmission or data transmission traditionally belongs to telecommunications and electrical engineering. Basic principles of data transmission may also be covered within the computer science or computer engineering topic of data communications, which also includes computer networking applications and communication protocols, for example, routing, switching and inter-process communication. Although the Transmission Control Protocol (TCP) involves transmission, TCP and other transport layer protocols are covered in computer networking but not discussed in a textbook or course about data transmission.

In most textbooks, the term analog transmission only refers to the transmission of an analog message signal (without digitization) by means of an analog signal, either as a non-modulated baseband signal or as a passband signal using an analog modulation method such as AM or FM. It may also include analog-over-analog pulse modulated baseband signals such as pulse-width modulation. In a few books within the computer networking tradition, analog transmission also refers to passband transmission of bit-streams using digital modulation methods such as FSK, PSK and ASK.

The theoretical aspects of data transmission are covered by information theory and coding theory.

== Protocol layers and sub-topics ==
Courses and textbooks in the field of data transmission typically deal with the following OSI model protocol layers and topics:

- Layer 1, the physical layer:
  - Channel coding including
    - Digital modulation schemes
    - Line coding schemes
    - Forward error correction (FEC) codes
  - Bit synchronization
  - Multiplexing
  - Equalization
  - Channel models
- Layer 2, the data link layer:
  - Channel access schemes, media access control (MAC)
  - Packet mode communication and Frame synchronization
  - Error detection and automatic repeat request (ARQ)
  - Flow control
- Layer 6, the presentation layer:
  - Source coding (digitization and data compression), and information theory.
  - Cryptography (may occur at any layer)

It is also common to deal with the cross-layer design of those three layers.

== Applications and history ==
Data (mainly but not exclusively informational) has been sent via non-electronic (e.g. optical, acoustic, mechanical) means since the advent of communication. Analog signal data has been sent electronically since the advent of the telephone. However, the first data electromagnetic transmission applications in modern time were electrical telegraphy (1809) and teletypewriters (1906), which are both digital signals. The fundamental theoretical work in data transmission and information theory by Harry Nyquist, Ralph Hartley, Claude Shannon and others during the early 20th century, was done with these applications in mind.

In the early 1960s, Paul Baran invented distributed adaptive message block switching for digital communication of voice messages using switches that were low-cost electronics. Donald Davies invented and implemented modern data communication during 1965–7, including packet switching, high-speed routers, communication protocols, hierarchical computer networks and the essence of the end-to-end principle. Baran's work did not include routers with software switches and communication protocols, nor the idea that users, rather than the network itself, would provide the reliability. Both were seminal contributions that influenced the development of computer networks.

Data transmission is utilized in computers in computer buses and for communication with peripheral equipment via parallel ports and serial ports such as RS-232 (1969), FireWire (1995) and USB (1996). The principles of data transmission are also utilized in storage media for error detection and correction since 1951. The first practical method to overcome the problem of receiving data accurately by the receiver using digital code was the Barker code invented by Ronald Hugh Barker in 1952 and published in 1953. Data transmission is utilized in computer networking equipment such as modems (1940), local area network (LAN) adapters (1964), repeaters, repeater hubs, microwave links, wireless network access points (1997), etc.

In telephone networks, digital communication is utilized for transferring many phone calls over the same copper cable or fiber cable by means of pulse-code modulation (PCM) in combination with time-division multiplexing (TDM) (1962). Telephone exchanges have become digital and software controlled, facilitating many value-added services. For example, the first AXE telephone exchange was presented in 1976. Digital communication to the end user using Integrated Services Digital Network (ISDN) services became available in the late 1980s. Since the end of the 1990s, broadband access techniques such as ADSL, Cable modems, fiber-to-the-building (FTTB) and fiber-to-the-home (FTTH) have become widespread to small offices and homes. The current tendency is to replace traditional telecommunication services with packet mode communication such as IP telephony and IPTV.

Transmitting analog signals digitally allows for greater signal processing capability. The ability to process a communications signal means that errors caused by random processes can be detected and corrected. Digital signals can also be sampled instead of continuously monitored. The multiplexing of multiple digital signals is much simpler compared to the multiplexing of analog signals. Because of all these advantages, because of the vast demand to transmit computer data and the ability of digital communications to do so and because recent advances in wideband communication channels and solid-state electronics have allowed engineers to realize these advantages fully, digital communications have grown quickly.

The digital revolution has also resulted in many digital telecommunication applications where the principles of data transmission are applied. Examples include second-generation (1991) and later cellular telephony, video conferencing, digital TV (1998), digital radio (1999), and telemetry.

Data transmission, digital transmission or digital communications is the transfer of data over a point-to-point or point-to-multipoint communication channel. Examples of such channels include copper wires, optical fibers, wireless communication channels, storage media and computer buses. The data are represented as an electromagnetic signal, such as an electrical voltage, radio wave, microwave, or infrared light.

While analog transmission is the transfer of a continuously varying analog signal over an analog channel, digital communication is the transfer of discrete messages over a digital or an analog channel. The messages are either represented by a sequence of pulses by means of a line code (baseband transmission) or by a limited set of continuously varying waveforms (passband transmission), using a digital modulation method. The passband modulation and corresponding demodulation (also known as detection) are carried out by modem equipment. According to the most common definition of a digital signal, both baseband and passband signals representing bit-streams are considered as digital transmission, while an alternative definition only considers the baseband signal as digital, and passband transmission of digital data as a form of digital-to-analog conversion.

Data transmitted may be digital messages originating from a data source, for example, a computer or a keyboard. It may also be an analog signal, such as a phone call or a video signal, digitized into a bit-stream, for example,e using pulse-code modulation (PCM) or more advanced source coding (analog-to-digital conversion and data compression) schemes. This source coding and decoding is carried out by codec equipment.

== Serial and parallel transmission ==
In telecommunications, serial transmission is the sequential transmission of signal elements of a group representing a character or other entity of data. Digital serial transmissions are bits sent over a single wire, frequency or optical path sequentially. Because it requires less signal processing and fewer chances for error than parallel transmission, the transfer rate of each individual path may be faster. This can be used over longer distances, and a check digit or parity bit can be sent along with the data easily.

Parallel transmission is the simultaneous transmission of related signal elements over two or more separate paths. Multiple electrical wires are used that can transmit multiple bits simultaneously, which allows for higher data transfer rates than can be achieved with serial transmission. This method is typically used internally within the computer, for example, the internal buses, and sometimes externally for such things as printers. Timing skew can be a significant issue in these systems because the wires in parallel data transmission unavoidably have slightly different properties, so some bits may arrive before others, which may corrupt the message. This issue tends to worsen with distance, making parallel data transmission less reliable for long distances.

== Communication channels ==
Some communication channel types include:

- Data transmission circuit
- Full-duplex
- Half-duplex
- Simplex
- Multi-drop:
  - Bus network
  - Mesh network
  - Ring network
  - Star network
  - Wireless network
- Point-to-point

== Asynchronous and synchronous data transmission ==
Asynchronous serial communication uses start and stop bits to signify the beginning and end of transmission. This method of transmission is used when data is sent intermittently as opposed to in a solid stream.

Synchronous transmission synchronizes transmission speeds at both the receiving and sending ends of the transmission using clock signals. The clock may be a separate signal or embedded in the data. A continual stream of data is then sent between the two nodes. Due to there being no start and stop bits, the data transfer rate may be more efficient.

== See also ==
- Internetworking
- Media (communication)
- Network security
- Node-to-node data transfer
- Transmission (disambiguation)
