= Higher-order modulation =

Digital modulation type

Higher-order modulation is a type of digital modulation usually with an order of 4 or higher. Common examples include quadrature phase-shift keying (QPSK) and m-ary quadrature amplitude modulation (m-QAM).

These schemes transmit more bits per symbol, resulting in higher data rates and improved throughput. They also enhance bandwidth efficiency and can be realized through methods such as Quadrature Amplitude Modulation (QAM), which combines two Pulse Amplitude Modulation (PAM) signals in quadrature.

== See also ==
- phase-shift keying
