= Unipolar =

Unipolar may refer to:

== Electronics ==
- Unipolar generator, a DC electrical generator
- Unipolar stepper motor, a type of small DC electric motor
- Unipolar transistor, transistors that involve single-carrier-type operation

== Science and medicine ==
- Unipolar depression or major depressive disorder
- Unipolar mania, an uncommon mental disorder that causes manic episodes without any history of depression
- Unipolar neuron, a neuron with a single neurite

== Other uses ==
- Unipolar encoding, a line code
- Unipolarity, a distribution of power in international relations in which one state exercises most of the cultural, economic, and military influence
