= Random modulation =

Concept in signal processing

In the theories of modulation and of stochastic processes, random modulation is the creation of a new signal from two other signals by the process of quadrature amplitude modulation. In particular, the two signals are considered as being random processes. For applications, the two original signals need have a limited frequency range, and these are used to modulate a third sinusoidal carrier signal whose frequency is above the range of frequencies contained in the original signals.

== Details ==
The random modulation procedure starts with two stochastic baseband signals, $x_c(t)$ and $x_s(t)$, whose frequency spectrum is non-zero only for $f \in [-B/2,B/2]$. It applies quadrature modulation to combine these with a carrier frequency $f_0$ (with $f_0 > B/2$) to form the signal $x(t)$ given by

$$x(t)=x_c(t)\cos(2 \pi f_0 t)-x_s(t)\sin(2 \pi f_0 t)= \Re \left \{ \underline{x}(t)e^{j 2 \pi f_0 t}\right \} ,$$

where $\underline{x}(t)$ is the equivalent baseband representation of the modulated signal $x(t)$

$$\underline{x}(t)=x_c(t)+j x_s(t).$$

In the following it is assumed that $x_c(t)$ and $x_s(t)$ are two real jointly wide sense stationary processes. It can be shown that the new signal $x(t)$ is wide sense stationary if and only if $\underline{x}(t)$ is circular complex, i.e. if and only if $x_c(t)$ and $x_s(t)$ are such that

$$R_{x_c x_c}(\tau)=R_{x_s x_s}(\tau) \qquad  \text{and  }\qquad   R_{x_c x_s}(\tau)=-R_{x_s x_c}(\tau).$$

== Bibliography ==
- Papoulis, Athanasios; Pillai, S. Unnikrishna (2002). "Random walks and other applications". Probability, random variables and stochastic processes (4th ed.). McGraw-Hill Higher Education. pp. 463–473.
- Scarano, Gaetano (2009). Segnali, Processi Aleatori, Stima (in Italian). Centro Stampa d'Ateneo.
- Papoulis, A. (1983). "Random modulation: A review". IEEE Transactions on Acoustics, Speech, and Signal Processing. 31: 96–105. doi:10.1109/TASSP.1983.1164046.
