= Signal modulation =

Process of varying one or more properties of a periodic waveform

Categorization for signal modulation based on data and carrier types

Signal modulation is the process of varying one or more properties of a periodic waveform in electronics and telecommunication for the purpose of transmitting information.

The process encodes information in the form of a message signal modulated onto a carrier signal to be transmitted. For example, the message signal might be an audio signal representing sound from a microphone, a video signal representing moving images from a video camera, or a digital signal representing a sequence of binary digits, a bitstream from a computer.

Carrier waves are necessary when the frequency of the message is too low to practically transmit. Generally, receiving a radio wave requires a radio antenna with a length that is one-fourth of the wavelength of the transmitted wave. For low-frequency radio waves, wavelength is on the scale of kilometers and building such a large antenna is not practical.

Another purpose of modulation is to transmit multiple channels of information through a single communication medium, using frequency-division multiplexing (FDM). For example, in cable television (which uses FDM), many carrier signals, each modulated with a different television channel, are transported through a single cable to customers. Since each carrier occupies a different frequency, the channels do not interfere with each other. At the destination end, the carrier signal is demodulated to extract the information-bearing modulation signal.

A modulator is a device or circuit that performs modulation. A demodulator (sometimes detector) is a circuit that performs demodulation, the inverse of modulation. A modem (from modulator–demodulator), used in bidirectional communication, can perform both operations. The lower frequency band occupied by the modulation signal is called the baseband, while the higher frequency band occupied by the modulated carrier is called the passband.

Signal modulation techniques are fundamental methods used in wireless communication to encode information onto a carrier wave by varying its amplitude, frequency, or phase. Key techniques and their typical applications

Types of Signal Modulation

Category	Modulation type	Key features	Example uses
Analog modulation	AM	Varies amplitude of carrier	AM radio
	FM	Varies frequency of carrier	FM and two-way radio
	PM	Varies phase of carrier	Analog TV and satellite
Digital modulation	ASK	Amplitude represents binary data	RFID, Optical Comm
	FSK	Frequency shift encodes data	Modems, Bluetooth
	PSK	Phase of carrier encodes bits	Wi-Fi, Satellite
	QPSK	4 phase states: two bits per symbol	DVB, LTE
	QAM	Both amplitude and phase vary; can transmit multiple bits	Cable TV, Wi-Fi
	OFDM	Multiple carriers, each modulated separately	4G/5G, Wi-Fi
Pulse modulation	PWM	Pulse width represents amplitude	Motor Control, Audio
	PPM	Pulse position within a time slot represents data	Optical Comm., Radar
Spread spectrum	DSSS	Signal bandwidth spread using code sequence	CDMA, GPS
	FHSS	Carrier hops between different frequencies	Bluetooth, Military

- Amplitude Shift Keying (ASK): Varies the amplitude of the carrier signal to represent data. Simple and energy efficient, but vulnerable to noise. Used in RFID and sensor networks.
- Frequency Shift Keying (FSK): Changes the frequency of the carrier signal to encode information. Resistant to noise, simple in implementation, often used in telemetry and paging systems.
- Phase Shift Keying (PSK): Modifies the phase of the carrier signal based on data. Common forms include Binary PSK (BPSK) and Quadrature PSK (QPSK), used in Wi-Fi, Bluetooth, and cellular networks. Offers good spectral efficiency and robustness against interference.
- Quadrature Amplitude Modulation (QAM): Simultaneously varies both amplitude and phase to transmit multiple bits per symbol, increasing data rates. Used extensively in Wi-Fi, cable television, and LTE systems.
- Orthogonal Frequency Division Multiplexing (OFDM): Splits the data across multiple, closely spaced sub-carriers, each modulated separately (often with QAM or PSK). Provides high spectral efficiency and robustness in multipath environments and is widely used in WLAN, LTE, and WiMAX.

Other advanced techniques:

- Amplitude Phase Shift Keying (APSK): Combines features of PSK and QAM, mainly used in satellite communications for improved power efficiency.
- Spread Spectrum (e.g., DSSS): Spreads the signal energy across a wide band for robust, low probability of intercept transmission.

In analog modulation, an analog modulation signal is "impressed" on the carrier. Examples are amplitude modulation (AM) in which the amplitude (strength) of the carrier wave is varied by the modulation signal, and frequency modulation (FM) in which the frequency of the carrier wave is varied by the modulation signal. These were the earliest types of modulation, and are used to transmit an audio signal representing sound in AM and FM radio broadcasting. More recent systems use digital modulation, which impresses a digital signal consisting of a sequence of binary digits (bits), a bitstream, on the carrier, by means of mapping bits to elements from a discrete alphabet to be transmitted. This alphabet can consist of a set of real or complex numbers, or sequences, like oscillations of different frequencies, so-called frequency-shift keying (FSK) modulation. A more complicated digital modulation method that employs multiple carriers, orthogonal frequency-division multiplexing (OFDM), is used in WiFi networks, digital radio stations and digital cable television transmission.

== Analog modulation methods ==
A low-frequency message signal (top) may be carried by an AM or FM radio wave.

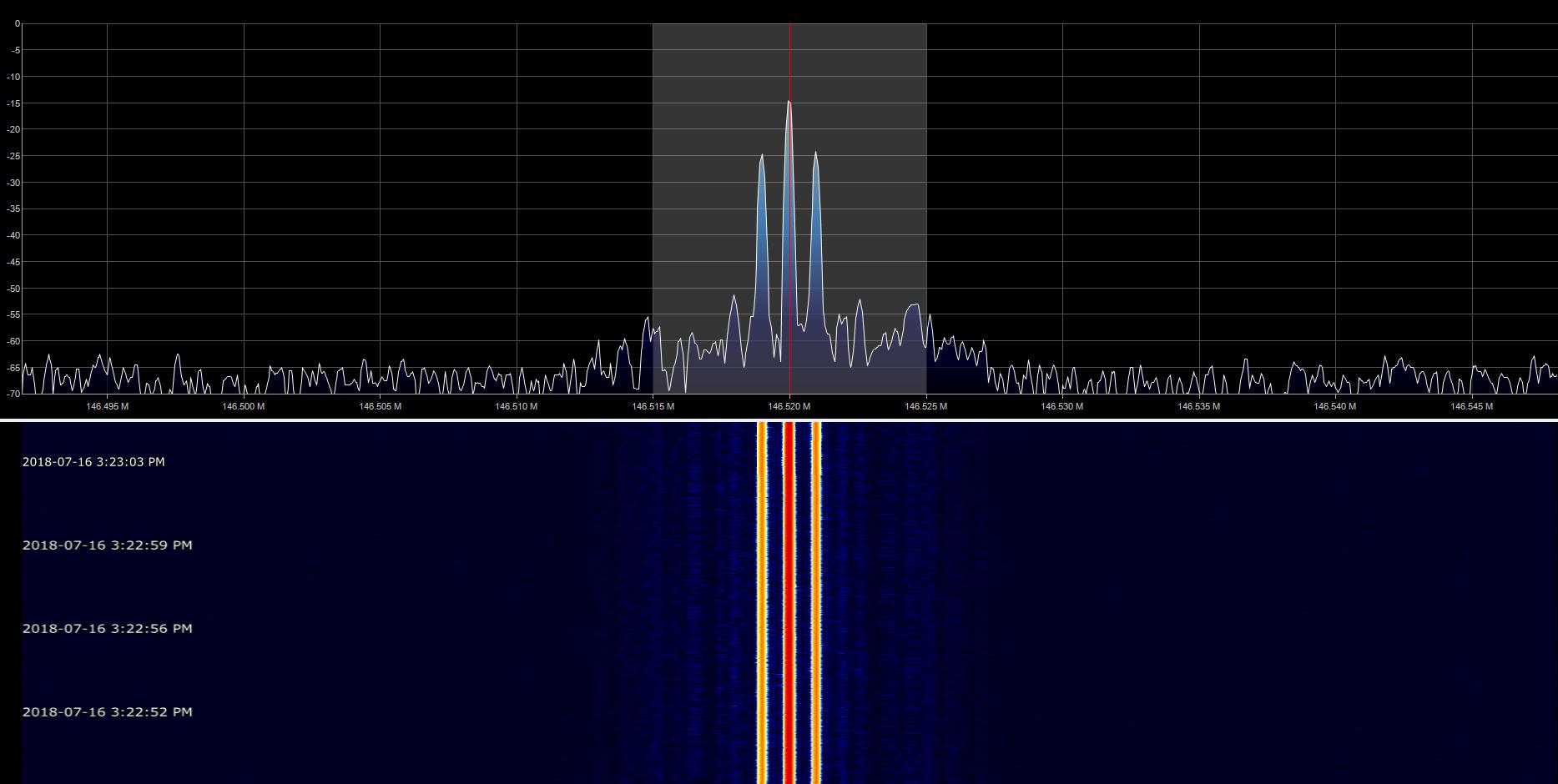
Waterfall plot of a 146.52 MHz radio carrier, with amplitude modulation by a 1,000 Hz sinusoid. Two strong sidebands at + and - 1 kHz from the carrier frequency are shown.

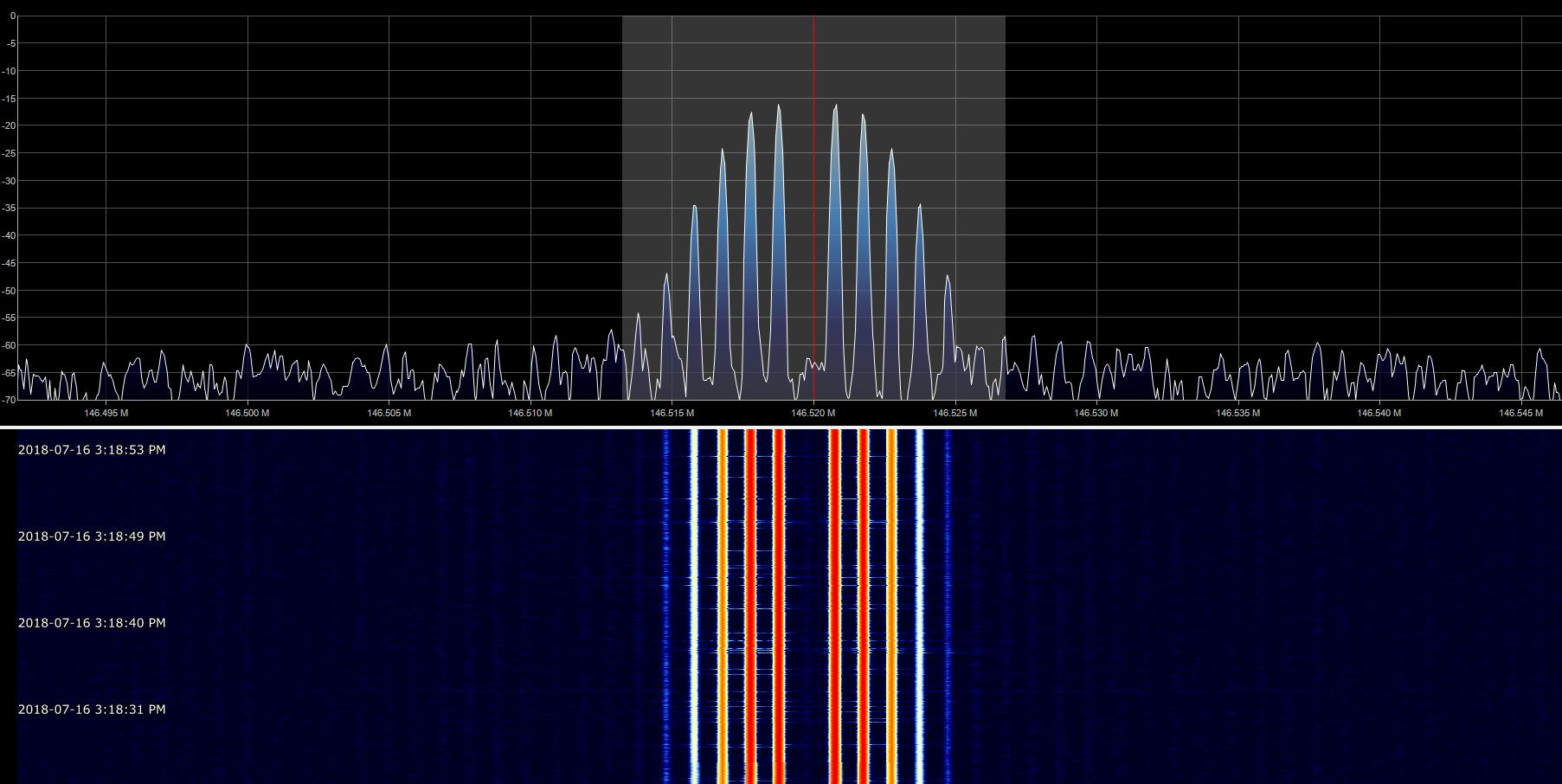
A carrier, frequency modulated by a 1,000 Hz sinusoid. The modulation index has been adjusted to around 2.4, so the carrier frequency has small amplitude. Several strong sidebands are apparent; in principle, an infinite number are produced in FM, but the higher-order sidebands are of negligible magnitude.

In analog modulation, the modulation is applied continuously in response to the analog information signal. Common analog modulation techniques include:

- Amplitude modulation (AM) (here the amplitude of the carrier signal is varied in accordance with the instantaneous amplitude of the modulating signal)
  - Double-sideband modulation (DSB)
    - Double-sideband modulation with carrier (DSB-WC) (used on the AM radio broadcasting band)
    - Double-sideband suppressed-carrier transmission (DSB-SC)
    - Double-sideband reduced-carrier transmission (DSB-RC)
  - Single-sideband modulation (SSB, or SSB-AM)
    - Single-sideband modulation with carrier (SSB-WC)
    - Single-sideband modulation suppressed carrier modulation (SSB-SC)
  - Vestigial-sideband modulation (VSB, or VSB-AM)
  - Quadrature amplitude modulation (QAM)
- Angle modulation, which is approximately constant envelope
  - Frequency modulation (FM) (here the frequency of the carrier signal is varied in accordance with the instantaneous amplitude of the modulating signal)
  - Phase modulation (PM) (here the phase shift of the carrier signal is varied in accordance with the instantaneous amplitude of the modulating signal)
  - Transpositional Modulation (TM), in which the waveform inflection is modified, resulting in a signal where each quarter cycle is transposed in the modulation process. TM is a pseudo-analog modulation (AM). Where an AM carrier also carries a phase variable phase f(ǿ). TM is f(AM,ǿ)

== Digital modulation methods ==
In digital modulation, an analog carrier signal is modulated by a discrete signal. Digital modulation methods can be considered as digital-to-analog conversion and the corresponding demodulation or detection as analog-to-digital conversion. The changes in the carrier signal are chosen from a finite number of M alternative symbols (the modulation alphabet).

Schematic of 4 baud, 8 bit/s data link containing arbitrarily chosen values

A simple example: A telephone line is designed for transferring audible sounds, for example, tones, and not digital bits (zeros and ones). Computers may, however, communicate over a telephone line by means of modems, which are representing the digital bits by tones, called symbols. If there are four alternative symbols (corresponding to a musical instrument that can generate four different tones, one at a time), the first symbol may represent the bit sequence 00, the second 01, the third 10 and the fourth 11. If the modem plays a melody consisting of 1000 tones per second, the symbol rate is 1000 symbols/second, or 1000 baud. Since each tone (i.e., symbol) represents a message consisting of two digital bits in this example, the bit rate is twice the symbol rate, i.e. 2000 bits per second.

According to one definition of digital signal, the modulated signal is a digital signal. According to another definition, the modulation is a form of digital-to-analog conversion. Most textbooks would consider digital modulation schemes as a form of digital transmission, synonymous to data transmission; very few would consider it as analog transmission.

=== Fundamental digital modulation methods ===
The most fundamental digital modulation techniques are based on keying:

- PSK (phase-shift keying): a finite number of phases are used.
- FSK (frequency-shift keying): a finite number of frequencies are used.
- ASK (amplitude-shift keying): a finite number of amplitudes are used.

In Quadrature amplitude modulation (QAM), an in-phase signal (or I, with one example being a cosine waveform) and a quadrature phase signal (or Q, with an example being a sine wave) are amplitude modulated with a finite number of amplitudes and then summed. It can be seen as a two-channel system, each channel using ASK. The resulting signal is equivalent to a combination of PSK and ASK.

In all of the above methods, each of these phases, frequencies or amplitudes are assigned a unique pattern of binary bits. Usually, each phase, frequency or amplitude encodes an equal number of bits. This number of bits comprises the symbol that is represented by the particular phase, frequency or amplitude.

If the alphabet consists of $M = 2^N$ alternative symbols, each symbol represents a message consisting of N bits. If the symbol rate (also known as the baud rate) is $f_{S}$ symbols/second (or baud), the data rate is $N f_{S}$ bit/second.

For example, with an alphabet consisting of 16 alternative symbols, each symbol represents 4 bits. Thus, the data rate is four times the baud rate.

In the case of PSK, or ASK, where the carrier frequency of the modulated signal is constant, the modulation alphabet is often conveniently represented on a constellation diagram, showing the amplitude of the I signal at the x-axis, and the amplitude of the Q signal at the y-axis for each symbol.

=== Modulator and detector principles of operation ===
PSK and ASK, and sometimes also FSK, are often generated and detected using the principle of QAM. The I and Q signals can be combined into a complex-valued signal I+jQ (where j is the imaginary unit). The resulting so-called equivalent lowpass signal or equivalent baseband signal is a complex-valued representation of the real-valued modulated physical signal (the so-called passband signal or RF signal).

These are the general steps used by the modulator to transmit data:

1. Group the incoming data bits into codewords, one for each symbol that will be transmitted.
2. Map the codewords to attributes, for example, amplitudes of the I and Q signals (the equivalent low-pass signal), or frequency or phase values.
3. Adapt pulse shaping or some other filtering to limit the bandwidth and form the spectrum of the equivalent low-pass signal, typically using digital signal processing.
4. Perform digital to analog conversion (DAC) of the I and Q signals (since today all of the above is normally achieved using digital signal processing, DSP).
5. Generate a high-frequency sine carrier waveform, and perhaps also a cosine quadrature component. Carry out the modulation, for example, by multiplying the sine and cosine waveforms with the I and Q signals, resulting in the equivalent low-pass signal being frequency shifted to the modulated passband signal or RF signal. Sometimes this is achieved using DSP technology, for example, direct digital synthesis using a waveform table, instead of analog signal processing. In that case, the above DAC step should be done after this step.
6. Amplification and analog bandpass filtering to avoid harmonic distortion and periodic spectrum.

At the receiver side, the demodulator typically performs:

1. Bandpass filtering.
2. Automatic gain control, AGC (to compensate for attenuation, for example fading).
3. Frequency shifting of the RF signal to the equivalent baseband I and Q signals, or to an intermediate frequency (IF) signal, by multiplying the RF signal with a local oscillator sine wave and cosine wave frequency (see the superheterodyne receiver principle).
4. Sampling and analog-to-digital conversion (ADC) (sometimes before or instead of the above point, for example by means of undersampling).
5. Equalization filtering, for example, a matched filter, compensation for multipath propagation, time spreading, phase distortion and frequency selective fading, to avoid intersymbol interference and symbol distortion.
6. Detection of the amplitudes of the I and Q signals, or the frequency or phase of the IF signal.
7. Quantization of the amplitudes, frequencies or phases to the nearest allowed symbol values.
8. Mapping of the quantized amplitudes, frequencies or phases to codewords (bit groups).
9. Parallel-to-serial conversion of the codewords into a bit stream.
10. Pass the resultant bit stream on for further processing, such as removal of any error-correcting codes.

As is common to all digital communication systems, the design of both the modulator and demodulator must be done simultaneously. Digital modulation schemes are possible because the transmitter-receiver pair has prior knowledge of how data is encoded and represented in the communications system. In all digital communication systems, both the modulator at the transmitter and the demodulator at the receiver are structured so that they perform inverse operations.

Asynchronous methods do not require a receiver reference clock signal that is phase synchronized with the sender carrier signal. In this case, modulation symbols (rather than bits, characters, or data packets) are asynchronously transferred. The opposite is synchronous modulation.

=== List of common digital modulation techniques ===
The most common digital modulation techniques are:

- Phase-shift keying (PSK)
  - Binary PSK (BPSK), using M=2 symbols
  - Quadrature PSK (QPSK), using M=4 symbols
  - 8PSK, using M=8 symbols
  - 16PSK, using M=16 symbols
  - Differential PSK (DPSK)
  - Differential QPSK (DQPSK)
  - Offset QPSK (OQPSK)
  - π/4–QPSK
- Frequency-shift keying (FSK)
  - Audio frequency-shift keying (AFSK)
  - Multi-frequency shift keying (M-ary FSK or MFSK)
  - Dual-tone multi-frequency signaling (DTMF)
- Amplitude-shift keying (ASK)
- On-off keying (OOK), the most common ASK form
  - M-ary vestigial sideband modulation, for example 8VSB
- Quadrature amplitude modulation (QAM), a combination of PSK and ASK
  - Polar modulation like QAM a combination of PSK and ASK
- Continuous phase modulation (CPM) methods
  - Minimum-shift keying (MSK)
  - Gaussian minimum-shift keying (GMSK)
  - Continuous-phase frequency-shift keying (CPFSK)
- Orthogonal frequency-division multiplexing (OFDM) modulation
  - Discrete multitone (DMT), including adaptive modulation and bit-loading
- Wavelet modulation
- Trellis coded modulation (TCM), also known as Trellis modulation
- Spread spectrum techniques
  - Direct-sequence spread spectrum (DSSS)
  - Chirp spread spectrum (CSS) according to IEEE 802.15.4a CSS uses pseudo-stochastic coding
  - Frequency-hopping spread spectrum (FHSS) applies a special scheme for channel release

MSK and GMSK are particular cases of continuous phase modulation. Indeed, MSK is a particular case of the sub-family of CPM known as continuous-phase frequency-shift keying (CPFSK) which is defined by a rectangular frequency pulse (i.e. a linearly increasing phase pulse) of one-symbol-time duration (total response signaling).

OFDM is based on the idea of frequency-division multiplexing (FDM), but the multiplexed streams are all parts of a single original stream. The bit stream is split into several parallel data streams, each transferred over its own sub-carrier using some conventional digital modulation scheme. The modulated subcarriers are summed to form an OFDM signal. This dividing and recombining help with handling channel impairments. OFDM is considered as a modulation technique rather than a multiplex technique since it transfers one bit stream over one communication channel using one sequence of so-called OFDM symbols. OFDM can be extended to multi-user channel access method in the orthogonal frequency-division multiple access (OFDMA) and multi-carrier code-division multiple access (MC-CDMA) schemes, allowing several users to share the same physical medium by giving different sub-carriers or spreading codes to different users.

Of the two kinds of RF power amplifier, switching amplifiers (Class D amplifiers) cost less and use less battery power than linear amplifiers of the same output power. However, they only work with relatively constant-amplitude-modulation signals such as angle modulation (FSK or PSK) and CDMA, but not with QAM and OFDM. Nevertheless, even though switching amplifiers are completely unsuitable for normal QAM constellations, often the QAM modulation principle are used to drive switching amplifiers with these FM and other waveforms, and sometimes QAM demodulators are used to receive the signals put out by these switching amplifiers.

=== Automatic digital modulation recognition (ADMR) ===
Automatic digital modulation recognition in intelligent communication systems is one of the most important issues in software-defined radio and cognitive radio. According to incremental expanse of intelligent receivers, automatic modulation recognition becomes a challenging topic in telecommunication systems and computer engineering. Such systems have many civil and military applications. Moreover, blind recognition of modulation type is an important problem in commercial systems, especially in software-defined radio. Usually, in such systems, there are some extra information for system configuration, but considering blind approaches in intelligent receivers, we can reduce information overload and increase transmission performance. Obviously, with no knowledge of the transmitted data and many unknown parameters at the receiver, such as the signal power, carrier frequency and phase offsets, timing information, etc., blind identification of the modulation is made fairly difficult. This becomes even more challenging in real-world scenarios with multipath fading, frequency-selective and time-varying channels.

There are two main approaches to automatic modulation recognition. The first approach uses likelihood-based methods to assign an input signal to a proper class. Another recent approach is based on feature extraction.

=== Digital baseband modulation ===
Digital baseband modulation changes the characteristics of a baseband signal, i.e., one without a carrier at a higher frequency.

This can be used as an equivalent signal to be later frequency-converted to a carrier frequency, or for direct communication in baseband. The latter methods both involve relatively simple line codes, as often used in local buses, and complicated baseband signalling schemes such as used in DSL.

== Pulse modulation methods ==
Pulse modulation schemes aim at transferring a narrowband analog signal over an analog baseband channel as a two-level signal by modulating a pulse wave. Some pulse modulation schemes also allow the narrowband analog signal to be transferred as a digital signal (i.e., as a quantized discrete-time signal) with a fixed bit rate, which can be transferred over an underlying digital transmission system, for example, some line code. These are not modulation schemes in the conventional sense since they are not channel coding schemes, but should be considered as source coding schemes, and in some cases, analog-to-digital conversion techniques.

Analog-over-analog methods

- Pulse-amplitude modulation (PAM)
- Pulse-width modulation (PWM) and pulse-depth modulation (PDM)
- Pulse-frequency modulation (PFM)
- Pulse-position modulation (PPM)

Analog-over-digital methods

- Pulse-code modulation (PCM)
  - Differential PCM (DPCM)
    - Adaptive DPCM (ADPCM)
- Delta modulation (DM or Δ-modulation)
  - Delta-sigma modulation (ΣΔ)
  - Continuously variable slope delta modulation (CVSDM), also called adaptive delta modulation (ADM)
- Pulse-density modulation (PDM)

== Miscellaneous modulation techniques ==
- The use of on-off keying to transmit Morse code at radio frequencies is known as continuous wave (CW) operation.
- Adaptive modulation
- Space modulation is a method whereby signals are modulated within airspace such as that used in instrument landing systems.
- The microwave auditory effect has been pulse modulated with audio waveforms to evoke understandable spoken numbers.

== See also ==
- Channel access methods
- Channel coding
- Codec
- Demodulation
- Electrical resonance
- Heterodyne
- Line code
- Modem
- Neuromodulation
- RF modulator
- Ring modulation
- Types of radio emissions
