= IFK (disambiguation) =

IFK may refer to:

- Idrottsföreningen Kamraterna, a central organisation for many sports clubs in Sweden
- ifk, the ISO 639-3 code for Tuwali language
- Incremental frequency keying, a modified type of MFSK modulation
- Kapitalmarktforschung, an independent research institute affiliated to the Goethe University Frankfurt
