= On–off keying =

Type of amplitude-shift keying modulation

On–off keying (OOK) denotes the simplest form of amplitude-shift keying (ASK) modulation that represents digital data as the presence or absence of a carrier wave. In its simplest form, the presence of a carrier for a specific duration represents a binary one, while its absence for the same duration represents a binary zero. Some more sophisticated schemes vary these durations to convey additional information. It is analogous to unipolar encoding line code.

On–off keying is most commonly used to transmit Morse code over radio frequencies (referred to as CW (continuous wave) operation), although in principle any digital encoding scheme may be used. OOK has been used in the ISM bands to transfer data between computers, for example.

OOK is more spectrally efficient than frequency-shift keying, but more sensitive to noise when using a regenerative receiver or a poorly implemented superheterodyne receiver. For a given data rate, the bandwidth of a BPSK (Binary Phase Shift keying) signal and the bandwidth of an OOK signal are equal.

In addition to RF carrier waves, OOK is also used in optical communication systems (e.g. IrDA and fiber-optic communication).

In aviation, some possibly unmanned airports have equipment that lets pilots key their VHF radio a number of times in order to request an Automatic Terminal Information Service broadcast, or turn on runway lights.

OOK is also used in remote garage and gate keys, often operating at 433.92 MHz, in combination with rolling codes.
