= Continuous phase modulation =

Method for modulation of data

Continuous phase modulation (CPM) is a method for modulation of data commonly used in wireless modems. In contrast to other coherent digital phase modulation techniques where the carrier phase abruptly resets to zero at the start of every symbol (e.g. M-PSK), with CPM the carrier phase is modulated in a continuous manner. For instance, with QPSK the carrier instantaneously jumps from a sine to a cosine (i.e. a 90 degree phase shift) whenever one of the two message bits of the current symbol differs from the two message bits of the previous symbol. This discontinuity requires a relatively large percentage of the power to occur outside of the intended band (e.g., high fractional out-of-band power), leading to poor spectral efficiency. Furthermore, CPM is typically implemented as a constant-envelope waveform, i.e., the transmitted carrier power is constant. Therefore, CPM is attractive because the phase continuity yields high spectral efficiency, and the constant envelope yields excellent power efficiency. The primary drawback is the high implementation complexity required for an optimal receiver.

== Phase memory ==
Each symbol is modulated by gradually changing the phase of the carrier from the starting value to the final value, over the symbol duration. The modulation and demodulation of CPM is complicated by the fact that the initial phase of each symbol is determined by the cumulative total phase of all previous transmitted symbols, which is known as the phase memory. Therefore, the optimal receiver cannot make decisions on any isolated symbol without taking the entire sequence of transmitted symbols into account. This requires a maximum-likelihood sequence estimator (MLSE), which is efficiently implemented using the Viterbi algorithm.

== Phase trajectory ==
Minimum-shift keying (MSK) is another name for CPM with an excess bandwidth of 1/2 and a linear phase trajectory. Although this linear phase trajectory is continuous, it is not smooth since the derivative of the phase is not continuous. The spectral efficiency of CPM can be further improved by using a smooth phase trajectory. This is typically accomplished by filtering the phase trajectory prior to modulation, commonly using a raised cosine or a Gaussian filter. The raised cosine filter has zero crossings offset by exactly one symbol time, and so it can yield a full-response CPM waveform that prevents intersymbol interference (ISI).

== Partial response CPM ==
Partial-response signaling, such as duo-binary signaling, is a form of intentional ISI where a certain number of adjacent symbols interfere with each symbol in a controlled manner. A MLSE must be used to optimally demodulate any signal in the presence of ISI. Whenever the amount of ISI is known, such as with any partial-response signaling scheme, MLSE can be used to determine the exact symbol sequence (in the absence of noise). Since the optimal demodulation of full-response CPM already requires MLSE detection, using partial-response signaling requires little additional complexity, but can afford a comparatively smoother phase trajectory, and thus, even greater spectral efficiency. One extremely popular form of partial-response CPM is GMSK, which is used by GSM in most of the world's 2nd generation cell phones. It is also used in 802.11 FHSS, Bluetooth, and many other proprietary wireless modems.

== Continuous-phase frequency-shift keying ==
Continuous-phase frequency-shift keying (CPFSK) is a commonly used variation of frequency-shift keying (FSK), which is itself a special case of analog frequency modulation. FSK is a method of modulating digital data onto a sinusoidal carrier wave, encoding the information present in the data to variations in the carrier's instantaneous frequency between one of two frequencies (referred to as the space frequency and mark frequency). In general, a standard FSK signal does not have continuous phase, as the modulated waveform cuts instantaneously between two sinusoids with different frequencies.

As the name suggests, the phase of a CPFSK is in fact continuous; this attribute is desirable for signals that are to be transmitted over a bandlimited channel, as discontinuities in a signal introduce wideband frequency components. In addition, some classes of amplifiers exhibit nonlinear behavior when driven with nearly discontinuous signals; this could have undesired effects on the shape of the transmitted signal.

=== Theory ===
If a finitely valued digital signal to be transmitted (the message) is m(t), then the corresponding CPFSK signal is

$$s(t) = A_c \cos\left(2 \pi f_c t + D_f \int_{-\infty}^{t} m(\alpha) d \alpha\right)\,$$

where A_{c} represents the amplitude of the CPFSK signal, f_{c} is the base carrier frequency, and D_{f} is a parameter that controls the frequency deviation of the modulated signal. The integral located inside of the cosine's argument is what gives the CPFSK signal its continuous phase; an integral over any finitely valued function (which m(t) is assumed to be) will not contain any discontinuities. If the message signal is assumed to be causal, then the limits on the integral change to a lower bound of zero and a higher bound of t.

Note that this does not mean that m(t) must be continuous; in fact, most ideal digital data waveforms contain discontinuities. However, even a discontinuous message signal will generate a proper CPFSK signal.

== See also ==
- Minimum-shift keying (MSK)
