= M-ary transmission =

An M-ary transmission is a type of digital modulation. Instead of sending one bit at a time as in binary, multiple messages, M, are sent. The binary data stream is divided into n tuples, where n = log₂ M bits. The signals can be represented as different frequencies, as in MFSK. In Mpsk, a data bit is represented by a symbol with a particular initial phase, increasing bandwidth efficiency n times. In M-ary ASK, MAM, signals have the same phase but different amplitudes, and in M-ary PSK, signals have the same amplitude but different phases. QAM uses both amplitude and phase modulations.

This type of transmission results in reduced channel bandwidth. However, sometimes, two or more quadrature carriers are used for modulation. This process is known as quadrature modulation.
