= Wavelet modulation =

Wavelet modulation, also known as fractal modulation, is a modulation technique that makes use of wavelet transformations to represent the data being transmitted. One of the objectives of this type of modulation is to send data at multiple rates over a channel that is unknown. If the channel is not clear for one specific bit rate, meaning that the signal will not be received, the signal can be sent at a different bit rate where the signal-to-noise ratio is higher.
