= Minimum-shift keying =

Type of continuous-phase frequency-shift keying

In digital modulation, minimum-shift keying (MSK) is a type of continuous-phase frequency-shift keying that was developed in the late 1950s by Collins Radio employees Melvin L. Doelz and Earl T. Heald. Similar to OQPSK, MSK is encoded with bits alternating between quadrature components, with the Q component delayed by half the symbol period.

However, instead of square pulses as OQPSK uses, MSK encodes each bit as a half sinusoid. This results in a constant-modulus signal (constant envelope signal), which reduces problems caused by non-linear distortion. In addition to being viewed as related to OQPSK, MSK can also be viewed as a continuous-phase frequency-shift keyed (CPFSK) signal with a frequency separation of one-half the bit rate.

In MSK the difference between the higher and lower frequency is identical to half the bit rate. Consequently, the waveforms used to represent a 0 and a 1 bit differ by exactly half a carrier period. Thus, the maximum frequency deviation is δ = 0.5 f_{m} where f_{m} is the maximum modulating frequency. As a result, the modulation index m is 0.5. This is the smallest FSK modulation index that can be chosen such that the waveforms for 0 and 1 are orthogonal. A variant of MSK called Gaussian minimum-shift keying (GMSK) is used in the GSM mobile phone standard.

== Mathematical representation ==
MSK waveform can also be designed as OQPSK (i.e. in I/Q manner) with the sinusoidal pulse shaping. Mapping changes in continuous phase. Each bit time, the carrier phase changes by ±90°.

The resulting signal is represented by the formula:

$$s(t) = a_{I}(t)\cos{\left(\frac{{\pi}t}{2T}\right)}\cos{(2{\pi}f_{c}t)}-a_{Q}(t)\sin{\left(\frac{{\pi}t}{2T}\right)}\sin{\left(2{\pi}f_{c}t\right)}$$

where $a_{I}(t)$ and $a_{Q}(t)$ encode the even and odd information respectively with a sequence of square pulses of duration 2T. $a_I(t)$ has its pulse edges on $t = [-T, T, 3T, \ldots]$ and $a_{Q}(t)$ on $t = [0, 2T, 4T, \ldots]$. The carrier frequency is $f_{c}$.

Using the trigonometric identity, this can be rewritten in a form where the phase and frequency modulation are more obvious,

$$s(t) = \cos\left[2 \pi f_c t + b_k(t) \frac{\pi t}{2 T} + \phi_k\right]$$

where b_{k}(t) is +1 when $a_I(t) = a_Q(t)$ and −1 if they are of opposite signs, and $\phi_k$ is 0 if $a_I(t)$ is 1, and $\pi$ otherwise. Therefore, the signal is modulated in frequency and phase, and the phase changes continuously and linearly.

== Properties ==
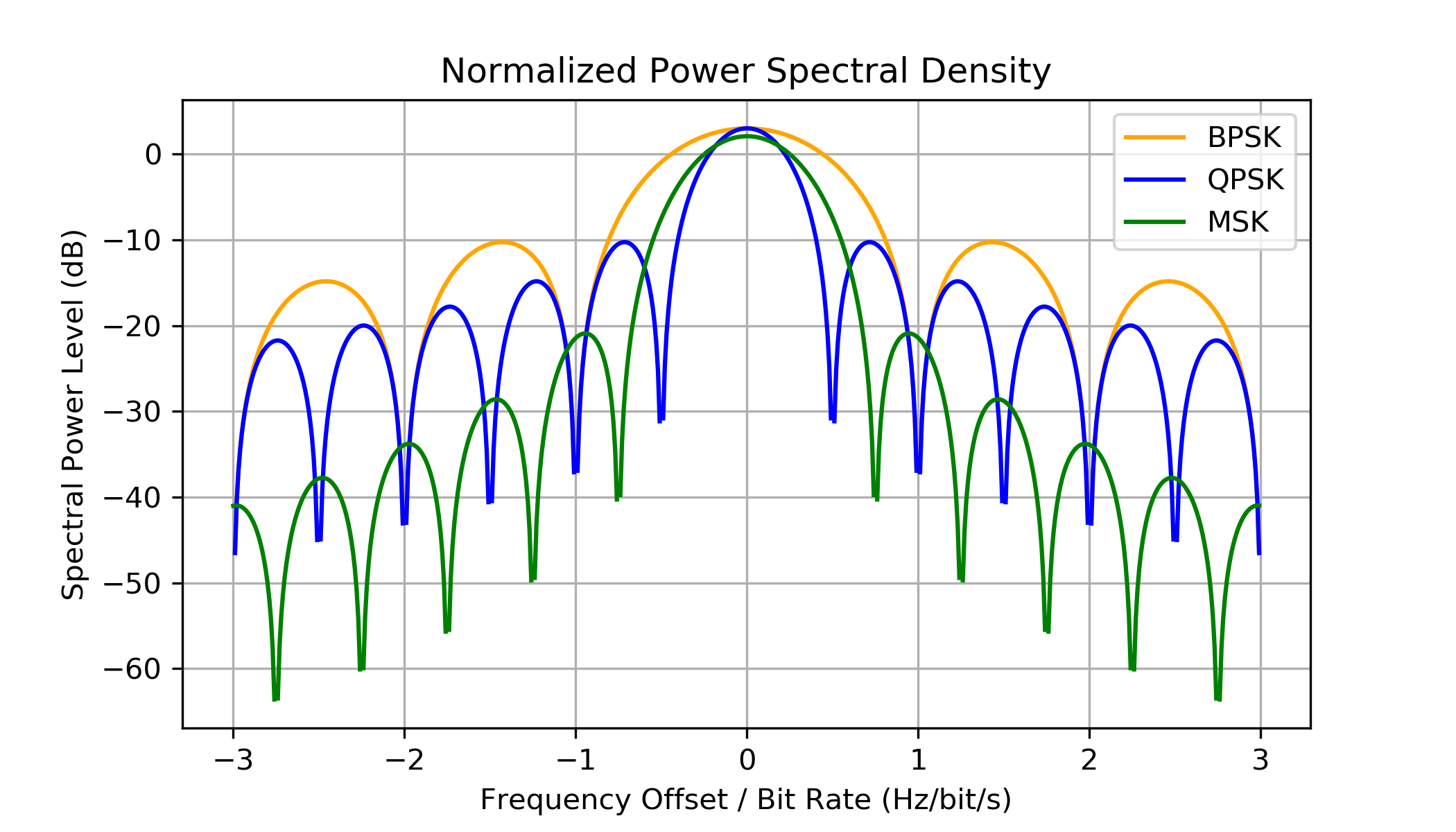
Power spectral density of MSK, BPSK, and QPSK. The side-lobes of MSK are lower (−23 dB) than in both BPSK and QPSK cases (−10 dB). Therefore, the inter-channel interference is lower in MSK case. Moreover, the main lobe of the MSK signal is wider, which means more energy in the null-to-null bandwidth. However, this can be also the disadvantage where extremely narrow bandwidth is required (null-to-null bandwidth of QPSK is equal to 3dB-bandwidth, null-to-null bandwidth of the MSK signal is 1.5 times as large as the 3dB-bandwidth.

Since the minimum symbol distance is the same as in the QPSK, the following formula can be used for the theoretical bit-error ratio bound:

$$P_b = Q\left(\sqrt{\frac{2E_b}{N_0}}\right) = \frac{1}{2}\operatorname{erfc}\left(\sqrt{\frac{E_b}{N_0}}\right)$$

where $E_b$ is the energy per one bit, $N_0$ is the noise spectral density, $Q(*)$ denotes the Q-function and $\operatorname{erfc}$ denotes the complementary error function.

== Gaussian minimum-shift keying ==
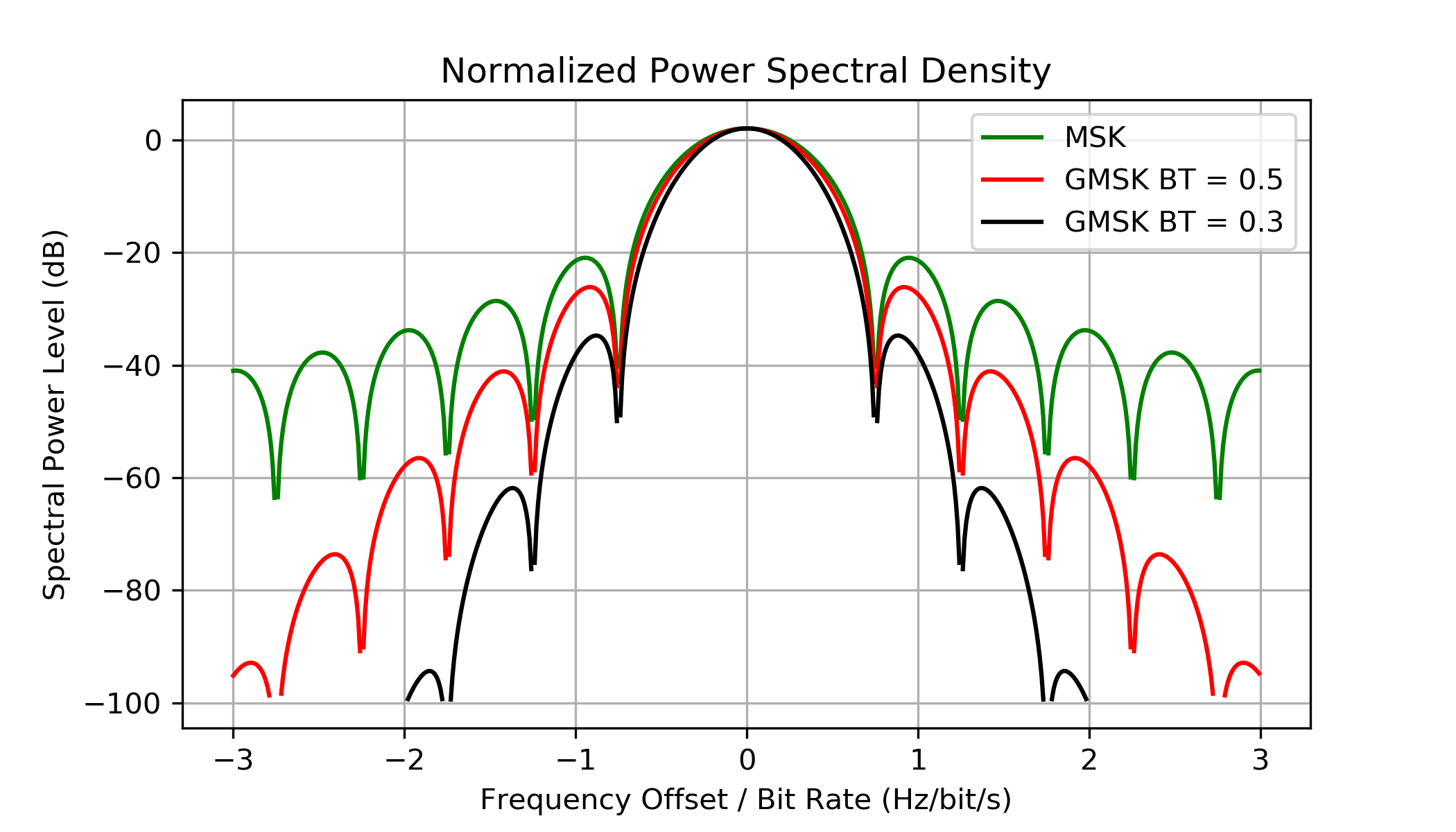
Power spectral densities of MSK and GMSK. Note that the decreasing of time-bandwidth $BT$ negatively influences bit-error-rate performance due to increasing intersymbol interference.

Gaussian minimum-shift keying, or GMSK, is similar to standard minimum-shift keying (MSK); however, the digital data stream is first shaped with a Gaussian filter before being applied to a frequency modulator, and typically has much narrower phase shift angles than most MSK modulation systems. This has the advantage of reducing sideband power, which in turn reduces out-of-band interference between signal carriers in adjacent frequency channels.

However, the Gaussian filter increases the modulation memory in the system and causes intersymbol interference, making it more difficult to differentiate between different transmitted data values and requiring more complex channel equalization algorithms such as an adaptive equalizer at the receiver. GMSK has high spectral efficiency, but it needs a higher power level than QPSK, for instance, in order to reliably transmit the same amount of data. GMSK is most notably used in the Global System for Mobile Communications (GSM), in Bluetooth, in satellite communications, and the Automatic Identification System (AIS) for maritime navigation.

== See also ==
- Constellation diagram used to examine the modulation in signal space (not time)
- Gaussian frequency-shift keying
