= Incremental frequency keying =

Incremental frequency keying, also known as IFK or IFK+, is a modified type of MFSK modulation where the data to be transmitted is represented by the difference in frequency between the previously received tone and the currently received tone.

This modulation produces a signal which is much more tolerant of receiver mis-tunings and frequency drift than MFSK modulation. Additionally, IFK modulation is more resistant to multipath interference and intersymbol interference caused by multipath propagation than traditional MFSK. This combination of features makes IFK modulation well suited for high frequency communications.

This modulation is used in the amateur radio data-modes DominioEX and THOR.
