= Quadrature amplitude modulation =

Family of digital modulation methods

Quadrature amplitude modulation (QAM) is the name of a family of signal modulation methods widely used in modern telecommunications to transmit information. At its core, it conveys two independent analog signals by changing (modulating) the amplitudes of two differently phased versions of a single carrier wave using amplitude modulation. These paired analog signal channels may then be used either directly or to encode digital bit streams using joint amplitude-shift keying across the synchronized channels.

The two carrier waves are of the same frequency and are out of phase with each other by 90°, a condition known as orthogonality or quadrature. The transmitted signal is created by adding the two carrier waves together. At the receiver, the two waves can be coherently separated (demodulated) because of their orthogonality. Another key property is that the modulations are low-frequency/low-bandwidth waveforms compared to the carrier frequency, which is known as the narrowband assumption.

In M-ary transmission amplitude-shift keying the phase is the same but with different amplitudes, while phase-shift keying (PSK) has the same amplitude but different phases. Combining these concepts leads to QAM, where both amplitude and phase are modulated, or two binary PSK signals are combined with orthogonal carriers.

QAM is used extensively as a modulation scheme for digital communications systems, such as in 802.11 Wi-Fi standards. Arbitrarily high spectral efficiencies can be achieved with QAM by setting a suitable constellation size, limited only by the noise level and linearity of the communications channel. QAM is being used in optical fiber systems as bit rates increase; QAM16 and QAM64 can be optically emulated with a three-path interferometer.

== Demodulation ==
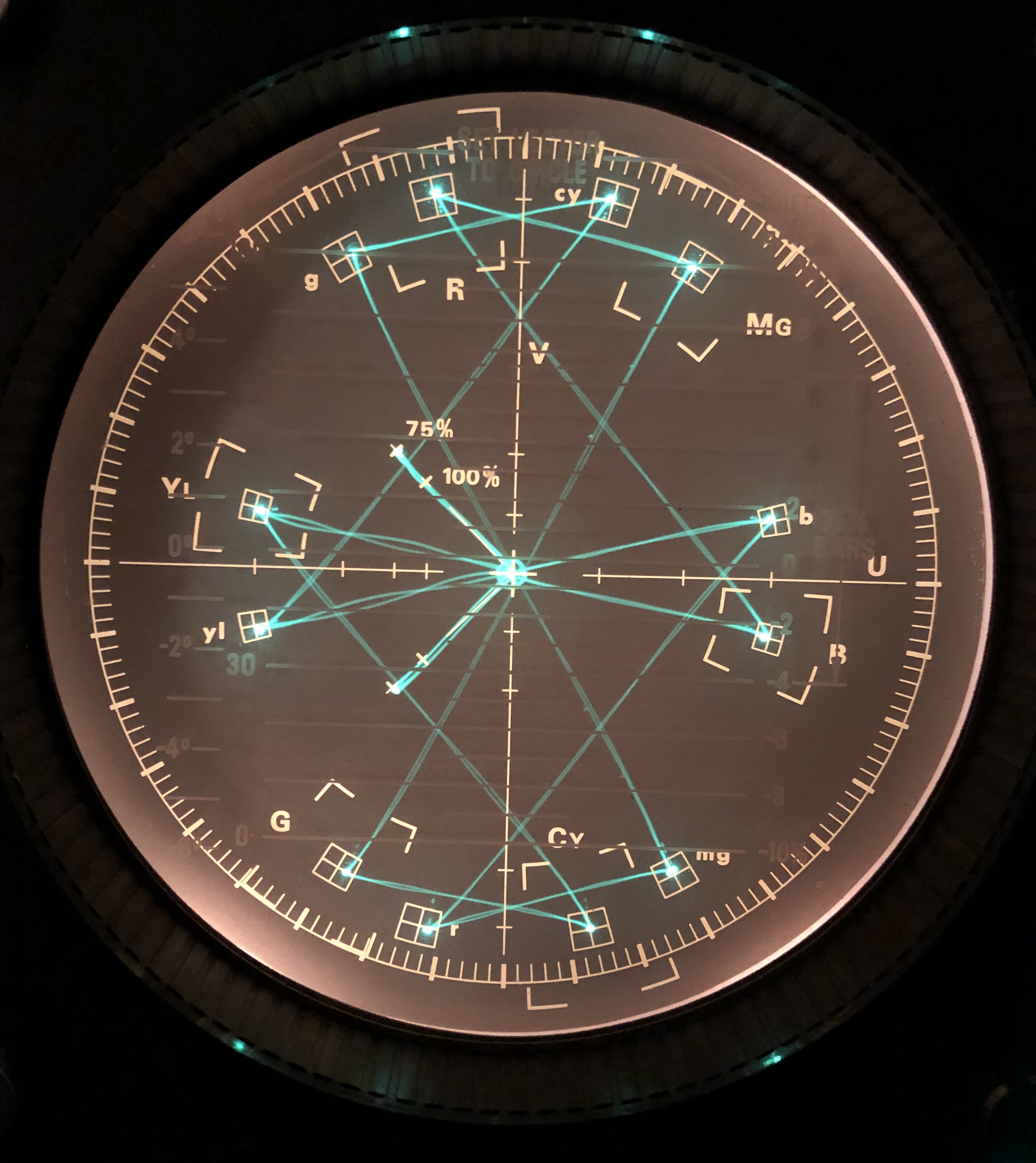
Analog QAM: PAL color bar signal on a vectorscope

In a QAM signal, one carrier lags the other by 90°, and its amplitude modulation is customarily referred to as the in-phase component, denoted by I(t). The other modulating function is the quadrature component, Q(t). So the composite waveform is mathematically modeled as
$$s_s(t) \triangleq \sin(2\pi f_c t) I(t)\ +\ \underbrace{\sin\left(2\pi f_c t + \tfrac{\pi}{2} \right)}_{\cos\left(2\pi f_c t\right)}\; Q(t),$$
or

$s_c(t) \triangleq \cos(2\pi f_c t) I(t)\ +\ \underbrace{\cos\left(2\pi f_c t + \tfrac{\pi}{2} \right)}_{-\sin\left(2\pi f_c t\right)}\; Q(t),$	Eq.1

where f_{c} is the carrier frequency. At the receiver, a coherent demodulator multiplies the received signal separately with both a cosine and sine signal to produce the received estimates of I(t) and Q(t). For example:
$$r(t) \triangleq s_c(t) \cos (2 \pi f_c t) = I(t) \cos (2 \pi f_c t) \cos (2 \pi f_c t) - Q(t) \sin (2 \pi f_c t) \cos (2 \pi f_c t).$$

Using standard trigonometric identities, we can write this as
$$\begin{align}
r(t) &= \tfrac{1}{2} I(t) \left[1 + \cos (4 \pi f_c t)\right] - \tfrac{1}{2} Q(t) \sin (4 \pi f_c t) \\
&= \tfrac{1}{2} I(t) + \tfrac{1}{2} \left[I(t) \cos (4 \pi f_c t) - Q(t) \sin (4 \pi f_c t)\right].
\end{align}$$

Low-pass filtering r(t) removes the high frequency terms (containing 4πf_{c}t), leaving only the I(t) term. This filtered signal is unaffected by Q(t), showing that the in-phase component can be received independently of the quadrature component. Similarly, we can multiply s_{c}(t) by a sine wave and then low-pass filter to extract Q(t).

The graphs of the sine (solid red) and cosine (dotted blue) functions are sinusoids of different phases.

The addition of two sinusoids is a linear operation that creates no new frequency components. So the bandwidth of the composite signal is comparable to the bandwidth of the DSB (double-sideband) components. Effectively, the spectral redundancy of DSB enables a doubling of the information capacity using this technique. This comes at the expense of demodulation complexity. In particular, a DSB signal has zero-crossings at a regular frequency, which makes it easy to recover the phase of the carrier sinusoid. It is said to be self-clocking. But the sender and receiver of a quadrature-modulated signal must share a clock or otherwise send a clock signal. If the clock phases drift apart, the demodulated I and Q signals bleed into each other, yielding crosstalk. In this context, the clock signal is called a "phase reference". Clock synchronization is typically achieved by transmitting a burst subcarrier or a pilot signal. The phase reference for NTSC, for example, is included within its color burst signal.

Analog QAM is used in:

- NTSC and PAL analog color television systems, where the I- and Q-signals carry the components of chroma (color) information. The QAM carrier phase is recovered from a special color burst waveform transmitted at the beginning of each scan line.
- C-QUAM ("Compatible QAM") is used in AM stereo radio to carry the stereo difference information.

== Fourier analysis ==
Applying Euler's formula to the sinusoids in Eq.1, the positive-frequency portion of s_{c} (or analytic representation) is
$$s_c(t)_+ = \tfrac{1}{2} e^{i2\pi f_c t}[I(t) + i Q(t)]
\quad\stackrel{\mathcal{F}}{\Longrightarrow}\quad
\tfrac{1}{2}\left[\widehat{I\ }(f - f_c) + e^{i\pi/2} \widehat Q(f - f_c)\right],$$
where $\mathcal{F}$ denotes the Fourier transform, and and are the transforms of I(t) and Q(t). This result represents the sum of two DSB-SC signals with the same center frequency. The factor of i (= e^{iπ/2}) represents the 90° phase shift that enables their individual demodulations.

== Digital QAM ==
Digital 16-QAM with example symbols

Constellation points for 4-QAM, 16-QAM, 32-QAM, and 64-QAM overlapped

As in many digital modulation schemes, the constellation diagram is useful for QAM. In QAM, the constellation points are usually arranged in a square grid with equal vertical and horizontal spacing, although other configurations are possible (e.g. a hexagonal or triangular grid). In digital telecommunications the data is usually binary, so the number of points in the grid is typically a power of 2 (2, 4, 8, ...), corresponding to the number of bits per symbol. The simplest and most commonly used QAM constellations consist of points arranged in a square, i.e. 16-QAM, 64-QAM and 256-QAM (even powers of two). Non-square constellations, such as Cross-QAM, can offer greater efficiency but are rarely used because of the cost of increased modem complexity.

By moving to a higher-order constellation, it is possible to transmit more bits per symbol. However, if the mean energy of the constellation is to remain the same (by way of making a fair comparison), the points must be closer together and are thus more susceptible to noise and other corruption; this results in a higher bit error rate and so higher-order QAM can deliver more data less reliably than lower-order QAM, for constant mean constellation energy. Using higher-order QAM without increasing the bit error rate requires a higher signal-to-noise ratio (SNR) by increasing signal energy, reducing noise, or both.

If data rates beyond those offered by 8-PSK are required, it is more usual to move to QAM since it achieves a greater distance between adjacent points in the I-Q plane by distributing the points more evenly. The complicating factor is that the points are no longer all the same amplitude and so the demodulator must now correctly detect both phase and amplitude, rather than just phase.

64-QAM and 256-QAM are often used in digital cable television and cable modem applications. In the United States, 64-QAM and 256-QAM are the mandated modulation schemes for digital cable (see QAM tuner) as standardised by the SCTE in the standard ANSI/SCTE 07 2013. In the UK, 64-QAM is used for digital terrestrial television (Freeview) whilst 256-QAM is used for Freeview-HD.

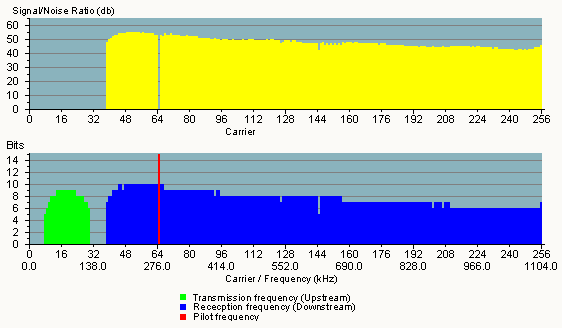
Bit-loading (bits per QAM constellation) on an ADSL line

Communication systems designed to achieve very high levels of spectral efficiency usually employ very dense QAM constellations. For example is ADSL technology for copper twisted pairs, whose constellation size goes up to 32768-QAM (in ADSL terminology this is referred to as bit-loading, or bit per tone, 32768-QAM being equivalent to 15 bits per tone).

Ultra-high capacity microwave backhaul systems also use 1024-QAM. With 1024-QAM vendors can obtain gigabit capacity in a single 56 MHz channel.

== Interference and noise ==
In moving to a higher order QAM constellation (higher data rate and mode) in hostile RF/microwave QAM application environments, such as in broadcasting or telecommunications, multipath interference typically increases. There is a spreading of the spots in the constellation, decreasing the separation between adjacent states, making it difficult for the receiver to decode the signal appropriately. In other words, there is reduced noise immunity. There are several test parameter measurements which help determine an optimal QAM mode for a specific operating environment. The following three are most significant:

- Carrier/interference ratio
- Carrier-to-noise ratio
- Threshold-to-noise ratio

Technologies that increase noise resistance include adaptive coding and modulation (ACM) and XPIC.

== See also ==
- Amplitude and phase-shift keying or asymmetric phase-shift keying (APSK)
- Carrierless amplitude phase modulation (CAP)
- Circle packing § Applications
- Error correction code
- In-phase and quadrature components
- Modulation for other examples of modulation techniques
- Phase-shift keying
- QAM tuner for HDTV
- Random modulation
