= Constant envelope =

Constant envelope is achieved when a sinusoidal waveform reaches equilibrium in a specific system. This happens when negative feedback in a control system, such as in radio automatic gain control or when an amplifier reaches steady state. Steady state, as defined in electrical engineering, occurs after a system becomes settled. To be more specific, control systems are unstable until they reach a steady state. Constant envelope needs to occur for the system to be stable, where there is the least noise and feedback gain has rendered the system steady.

Feedback is used to create a feedback signal to control gain, reduce distortion, control output voltage, improve stability or create instability, as in an oscillator. Some examples of constant envelope modulations are as FSK, GFSK, MSK, GMSK and Feher's IJF - All constant envelope modulations allow power amplifiers to operate at or near saturation levels. Although, the power spectrum efficiency of a non-constant amplitude envelope is always higher than that of a constant envelope modulation.

== See also ==
- Constant-weight code
- Envelope (waves)
