= MD10 =

MD10 may refer to:

- Boeing MD-10, a tri-jet wide-body airliner, a variant of the McDonnell Douglas DC-10
- Maryland Route 10 (MD 10), a state highway in the USA
- Military District 10 (M. D. 10), Manitoba, Canada; the recruiting district for the WW1 French-Canadian Brigade

== See also ==
- MD-1 (disambiguation)
- MD100 (disambiguation)
- MDX (disambiguation)
- 10 (disambiguation)
- MD (disambiguation)
