= Communication during the September 11 attacks =

Communication problems during the September 11 attacks

Communication problems and successes played an important role during the September 11 attacks in 2001 and their aftermath. Systems were variously destroyed or overwhelmed by loads greater than they were designed to carry, or failed to operate as intended or desired.

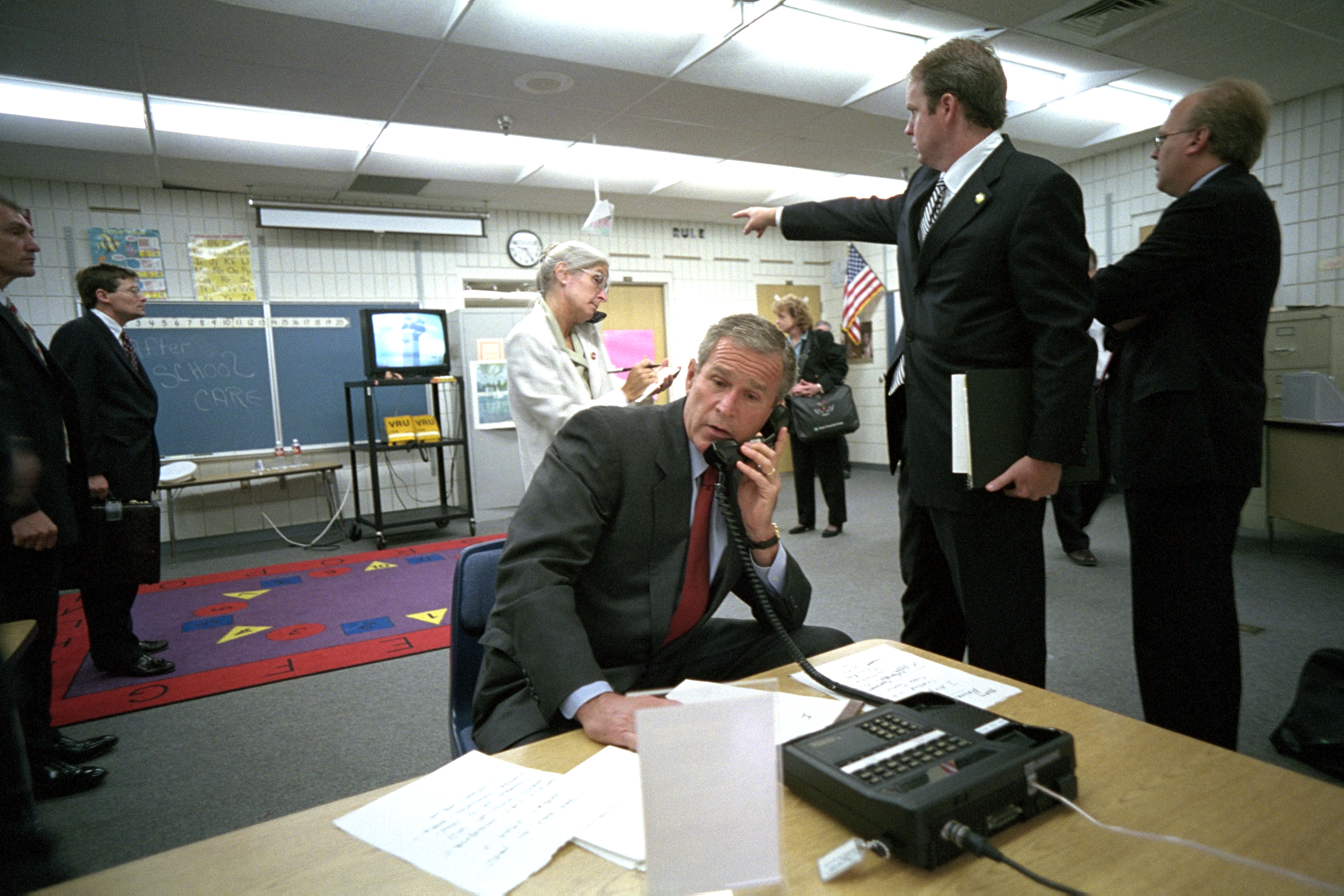
U.S. president George W. Bush talks on a STU-III secure telephone while in the Emma E. Booker Elementary School.

== Attackers ==
The organizers of the September 11, 2001 terrorist attacks apparently planned and coordinated their mission in face to face meetings and used little or no electronic communication. This "radio silence" made their plan more difficult to detect.

== Federal government ==
According to 9/11 Commission staff statement No. 17 there were several communications failures at the federal government level during and after the 9/11 attacks. Perhaps the most serious occurred in an "Air Threat Conference Call" initiated by the National Military Command Center (NMCC) after two planes had crashed into the World Trade Center, but shortly before The Pentagon was hit. The participants were unable to include the Federal Aviation Administration (FAA) air traffic control command center, which had the most information about the hijackings, in the call.

According to the staff report:

Operators worked feverishly to include the FAA in this teleconference, but they had equipment problems and difficulty finding secure phone numbers. NORAD asked three times before 10:03 to confirm the presence of FAA on the conference, to provide an update on hijackings. The FAA did not join the call until 10:17. The FAA representative who joined the call had no familiarity with or responsibility for a hijack situation, had no access to decision makers, and had none of the information available to senior FAA officials by that time. We found no evidence that, at this critical time, during the morning of September 11, NORAD’s top commanders, in Florida or Cheyenne Mountain Complex, ever coordinated with their counterparts at FAA headquarters to improve situational awareness and organize a common response. Lower-level officials improvised—the FAA’s Boston Center bypassing the chain of command to contact NEADS. But the highest level Defense Department officials relied on the NMCC’s Air Threat Conference, in which FAA did not meaningfully participate.

== First responders ==
After the 1993 World Trade Center bombing, radio repeaters for New York City Fire Department communication were installed in the tower complex. Because they were unaware that several controls needed to be operated to fully activate the repeater system, fire chiefs at their command post in the lobby of the North Tower thought the repeater was not functioning and did not use it, though it did work and was used by some firefighters. When police officials concluded the twin towers were in danger of collapsing and ordered police to leave the complex, fire officials were not notified. Fire officials on the scene were not monitoring broadcast news reports and did not immediately understand what had happened when the first (South) tower collapsed.

There was little communication between New York City Police Department and fire department commands even though an Office of Emergency Management (OEM) had been created in 1996 in part to provide such coordination. A primary reason for OEM's inability to coordinate communications and information-sharing in the early hours of the WTC response was the loss of its emergency operations center, located on the twenty third floor of 7 World Trade Center, which had been evacuated after debris from the main tower's collapse struck the building. This ignited several fires that caused it to collapse at 5 pm later that day.

Emergency relief efforts in both Lower Manhattan and at the Pentagon were augmented by volunteer amateur radio operators in the weeks after the attacks.

== Victims ==
Cell phones and in-plane credit card phones played a major role during and after the attack, starting with hijacked passengers who called family or notified the authorities about what was happening. Passengers and crew who made calls include: Sandra Bradshaw, Todd Beamer, Tom Burnett, Mark Bingham, Peter Hanson, Jeremy Glick, Barbara Olson, Renee May, Madeline Amy Sweeney, Betty Ong, Robert Fangman, Brian David Sweeney, and Ed Felt. Passengers and crew aboard United Airlines Flight 93 were able to assess their situation based on these conversations and plan a revolt that resulted in the aircraft crashing before reaching the hijackers’ intended target. According to the commission staff: "Their actions saved the lives of countless others, and may have saved either the U.S. Capitol or the White House from destruction."

According to the 9/11 Commission Report, 13 passengers from Flight 93 made a total of over 30 calls to both family and emergency personnel (twenty-two confirmed air phone calls, two confirmed cell phone and eight not specified in the report). Brenda Raney, Verizon Wireless spokesperson, said that Flight 93 was supported by several cell sites. There were reportedly three phone calls from Flight 11, five from Flight 175, and three calls from Flight 77. Two calls from these flights were recorded, placed by flight attendants: Betty Ong on Flight 11 and CeeCee Lyles on Flight 93.

Alexa Graf, an AT&T spokesperson, said it was almost a fluke that the calls reached their destinations. Marvin Sirbu, professor of Engineering and Public Policy at Carnegie Mellon University said on September 14, 2001, that "The fact of the matter is that cell phones can work in almost all phases of a commercial flight." Other industry experts said that it is possible to use cell phones with varying degrees of success during the ascent and descent of commercial airline flights.

After each of the hijacked aircraft struck the World Trade Center, people inside the towers made calls to family and loved ones; for the victims, this was their last communication. Other callers directed their pleas for help to 9-1-1. Over nine hours of the 9-1-1 calls were eventually released after petitioning by The New York Times and families of the WTC victims. In 2001, U.S. cell phones did not yet have the photography capabilities that became widespread by the mid-2000s.

== General public ==
After the attack, the cell phone networks of New York City and the Tri-State area were rapidly overloaded (a mass call event) as traffic doubled over normal levels. Cell phone traffic also overloaded across the East Coast, leading to crashes of the cell phone network. Verizon's downtown wire phone service was interrupted for days and weeks because of cut subscriber cables, and to the 140 West Street exchange being shut for days. Capacity between Brooklyn and Manhattan was also diminished by cut trunk cables.

Following the attacks, the issues with the cell network weren't resolved until 36 cellular COWs (cell towers on wheels) were deployed by September 14, 2001, in Lower Manhattan to support the U.S. Federal Emergency Management Agency (FEMA) and provide critical phone service to rescue and recovery workers.

Since three of the major television broadcast network owned-and-operated stations had their transmission towers atop the North Tower (One World Trade Center), coverage was limited after the collapse of the tower. The FM transmitter of National Public Radio station WNYC was also destroyed in the collapse of the North Tower and its offices evacuated. For an interim period, it continued broadcasting on its AM frequency and used NPR's New York offices to produce its programming.

Screencap of the frozen WPIX image

The satellite feed of one television station, WPIX, froze on the last image received from the WTC mast; the image (a remote-camera shot of the burning towers), viewable across North America (as WPIX is available on cable TV in many areas), remained on the screen for much of the day until WPIX was able to set up alternate transmission facilities. It shows the WTC at the moment power cut off to the WPIX transmitter, prior to the towers' collapse.

During the September 11 attacks, WCBS-TV channel 2 and WXTV-TV channel 41 stayed on the air. Unlike most other major New York television stations, WCBS-TV maintained a full-powered backup transmitter at the Empire State Building after moving its main transmitter to the North Tower of the World Trade Center. The station was also simulcasted nationally on Viacom (which at the time owned CBS) cable network VH1 that day. In the immediate aftermath of the attacks, the station lent transmission time to the other stations who had lost their transmitters, until they found suitable backup equipment and locations.

The Emergency Alert System was never activated in the terrorist attacks, as the extensive media coverage made it unnecessary.

AT&T eliminated any costs for domestic calls originating from the New York City area (phones using area codes 212, 718, 917, 646, and 347) in the days following 9/11.

== Radio communications ==
Radio communications during the September 11 attacks served a vital role in coordinating rescue efforts by New York Police Department, New York Fire Department, Port Authority Police Department, and emergency medical services.

While radio communications were modified to address problems discovered after the 1993 World Trade Center bombing, investigations into the radio communications during the September 11 attacks discovered that communication systems and protocols that distinguished each department was hampered by the lack of interoperability, damaged or failed network infrastructure during the attack, and overwhelmed by simultaneous communication between superiors and subordinates.

=== Background ===
A rough time line of the incident could include:

- 08:46 hrs.: American 11 crashes into the North Tower, a.k.a. 1 World Trade Center, (0 minutes elapsed time).
- 09:03 hrs.: United 175 crashes into the South Tower, a.k.a. 2 World Trade Center, (17 minutes elapsed time).
- 09:58 hrs.: South Tower, a.k.a. 2 World Trade Center collapses, (55 minutes after aircraft impact, 72 minutes elapsed time).
- 10:28 hrs.: North Tower, a.k.a. 1 World Trade Center collapses, (102 minutes elapsed time and post-impact).

The scale of the incident was described in the National Commission report on the attacks as unprecedented. In roughly seventeen minutes from 8:46 to 9:03 am, over a thousand police, fire, and emergency medical services (EMS) staff arrived at the scene. At some point during a large incident, any agency will reach a point where they find their resources overrun by needs. For example, the Port Authority Police could not schedule staff as if a September 11 attack would occur every shift. There is always a balance struck between readiness and costs. There is conflicting data but some sources suggest there may have been 2,000 to 3,000 workers involved in the rescue operation. It would be rare for most agencies to see an event where there were that many people to be rescued.

There is some level of confusion present in any large incident. The National Institute of Standards and Technology (NIST) asserts commanders did not have adequate information and interagency information sharing was inadequate. For example, on September 11, persons in the New York City Police Department (NYPD) 9-1-1 center told callers from the World Trade Center to remain in place and wait for instruction from firefighters and police officers. This was the plan for managing a fire incident in the building and the 9-1-1 center staff were following the plan. This was partly countered by public safety workers going floor-by-floor and telling people to evacuate. The 9/11 Commission report suggests people in the NYPD 9-1-1 center and New York City Fire Department (FDNY) dispatch would benefit from better situation awareness. The Commission described the call centers as not "fully integrated" with line personnel at the WTC. The report suggests the NYPD 9-1-1 center and FDNY dispatch were overrun by call volumes that had never been seen before. Adding to the confusion, radio coverage problems, radio traffic blocking, and building system problems occurred inside the burning towers. The facts show that much of the equipment worked as designed and users made the best of what was available to them.

Typical of any large fire, many 9-1-1 calls with conflicting information were received beginning at 8:46 am. In addition to reports that a plane had hit the World Trade Center, the EMS computer-aided dispatch (CAD) log shows reports of a helicopter crash, explosions, and a building fire. Throughout the incident, people at different locations had very different views of the situation. After the collapse of the first tower, many firefighters in the remaining tower had no idea the first tower had fallen.

Radio communications problems were compounded by off-duty personnel self-dispatching to the incident scene. Some off-duty staff went into the towers without radios. According to the Commission report and news coverage, this was true of NYPD, Port Authority Police Department (PAPD), and FDNY personnel. Regardless of any radio coverage problems, these persons could not be commanded or informed by radio. In any incident of this scale, self-dispatched staff without radios would likely be a problem. Even if a cache of radios were brought to the scene to hand out, the scale of this incident would likely exceed the number of radios in the cache.

NIST concluded that, at the beginning of the incident, there was an approximate factor of five (peak) increase in radio communications traffic over a normal level. After the initial peak, radio traffic through the incident followed an approximate factor of three steady increase. FDNY recordings suggest the dispatch personnel were overloaded: both fire and EMS dispatch were often delayed in responding to radio calls. Many 9-1-1 telephone calls to dispatch were disconnected or routed to "all circuits are busy now", intercept recordings.

=== Voice radio systems ===
NIST calculated that about one third of radio messages transmitted during the surge of communications were incomplete or unintelligible. Documentary footage suggests the tactical channels were also overloaded; some footage captured audio of two or three conversations occurring simultaneously on a particular channel.

In this study of WTC incident communications, radio systems used at the site had problems but were generally effective in that users were able to communicate with one another. The 2002 video documentary 9/11 by Gedeon and Jules Naudet captured audio from hand-held radios in use at the incident and showed users communicating over radios from the lobby command post in the North Tower. 26 Red Book audio CDs of New York City Fire Department radio transmissions, covering the incident's initial dispatch and the tower failures, were reviewed. These CDs were digitized versions of audio from the Fire Department's logging recorders. In addition, text on an oral history CD with transcripts of fire personnel debriefed on the incident were reviewed.

==== NYPD and PAPD systems in 2001 ====
In 2001, the NYPD used Ultra High Frequency (UHF) radios and divided the city into 35 radio zones. Most hand-held radios had at least 20 channels: while not all officers had all channels, all officers had the ability to communicate citywide. As a characteristic of physics, UHF signals penetrate buildings better than lower Very High Frequency (VHF) frequencies used by the FDNY fire units but generally cover shorter distances over open terrain. The Commission report did not cite any technical flaws with the NYPD radio system.

PAPD has systems described as low-power UHF. The Commission report says the systems were specific to a single site with the exception of one channel which was Port-Authority-wide. It's unclear whether the PAPD systems were interstitial and limited to 2 watts output, used normal local-control channels but were limited in power output by the frequency coordinator, or used leaky cable systems which were solely intended to work inside the Port Authority buildings. The report says there were 7, site-specific Port Authority Police channels. In 2001, officers at one site could not, (in all cases), carry their radios to another site and use them. Not all radios had all channels.

==== Fire and EMS dispatch channels ====
Recordings of Citywide, Brooklyn, and Manhattan channels for Fire and Citywide, Brooklyn, and Manhattan channels for Emergency medical services were reviewed. Systems generally performed well. The audio coupling point for the logging recorder on Manhattan Fire made the dispatcher's voice difficult to hear. An anonymous fire dispatcher who identifies as Dispatcher 416 is noteworthy.

The Commission report says that, in 2001, FDNY used a system with 5 repeater channels: one for each of the boroughs of Manhattan, Brooklyn, Queens, with the Bronx and Staten Island sharing a single frequency using different Private Line (PL) tones, and a citywide channel. There were also five simplex channels in FDNY radios.

Observation shows, back in 2001, that the citywide EMS channel was voting more frequently than normal, signals were noisy, interfering signals were present, and that some receiver sites had equalization differences. Some transmissions had choppy audio possibly representative of interference from FSK paging or intermittent microwave radio paths to one or more receiver sites. For example, if a microwave radio path fails for half-second intervals, the voting comparator may vote out that receiver site until silence is detected. This can cause dropped syllables in the voted audio. Some transmissions were noisy, although transactions show the dispatcher was understanding radio traffic in spite of audio drop-outs in almost every case.

===== Port Authority fire repeater system (Repeater 7) =====
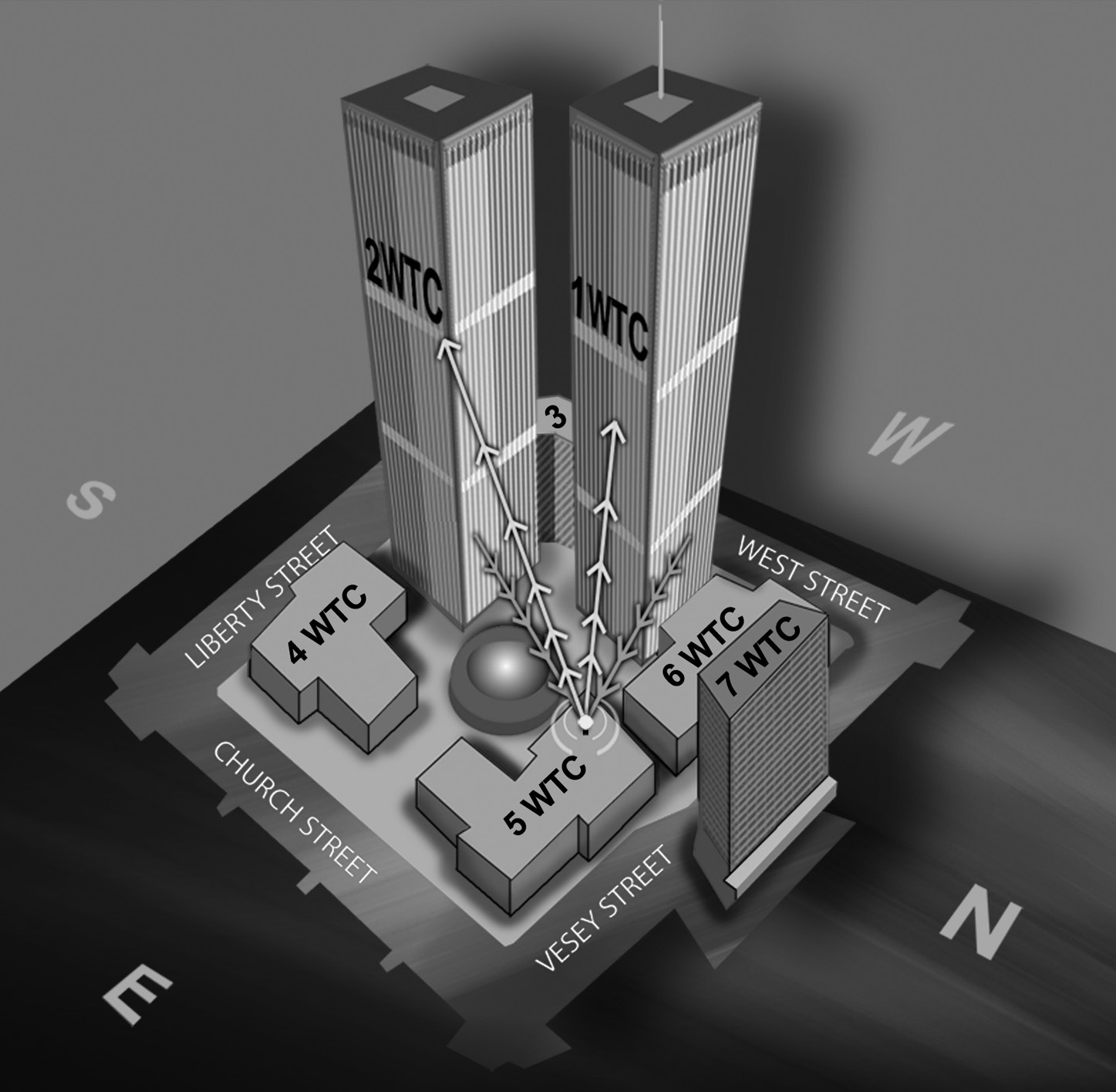
The World Trade Center Radio Repeater System was installed by Port Authority in 1994 to enhance FDNY radio communications in the difficult high-rise environment of the Twin Towers.

The Port Authority radio repeater, intended to allow communications inside the towers, did not appear to work as intended on September 11. The system, also called Port Authority Channel 30, was installed at Port Authority police desk in WTC 5 in 1994 after the 1993 World Trade Center attack. News accounts said the system had been turned off for unspecified technical reasons. The Commission report said it was customary to turn the system off because it somehow caused interference to radios in use at fire operations in other parts of the city. The documentary film gives different information, with a Fire Department member from Engine 7/Ladder 1 claiming that the aircraft's impact caused the system to fail. Evidence suggests the remote control console in the lobby command was not working but the repeater was. The radio repeater was located in 5 World Trade Center. A remote control console was connected to the repeater allowing staff at the North Tower lobby command post to communicate without using a hand-held radio.

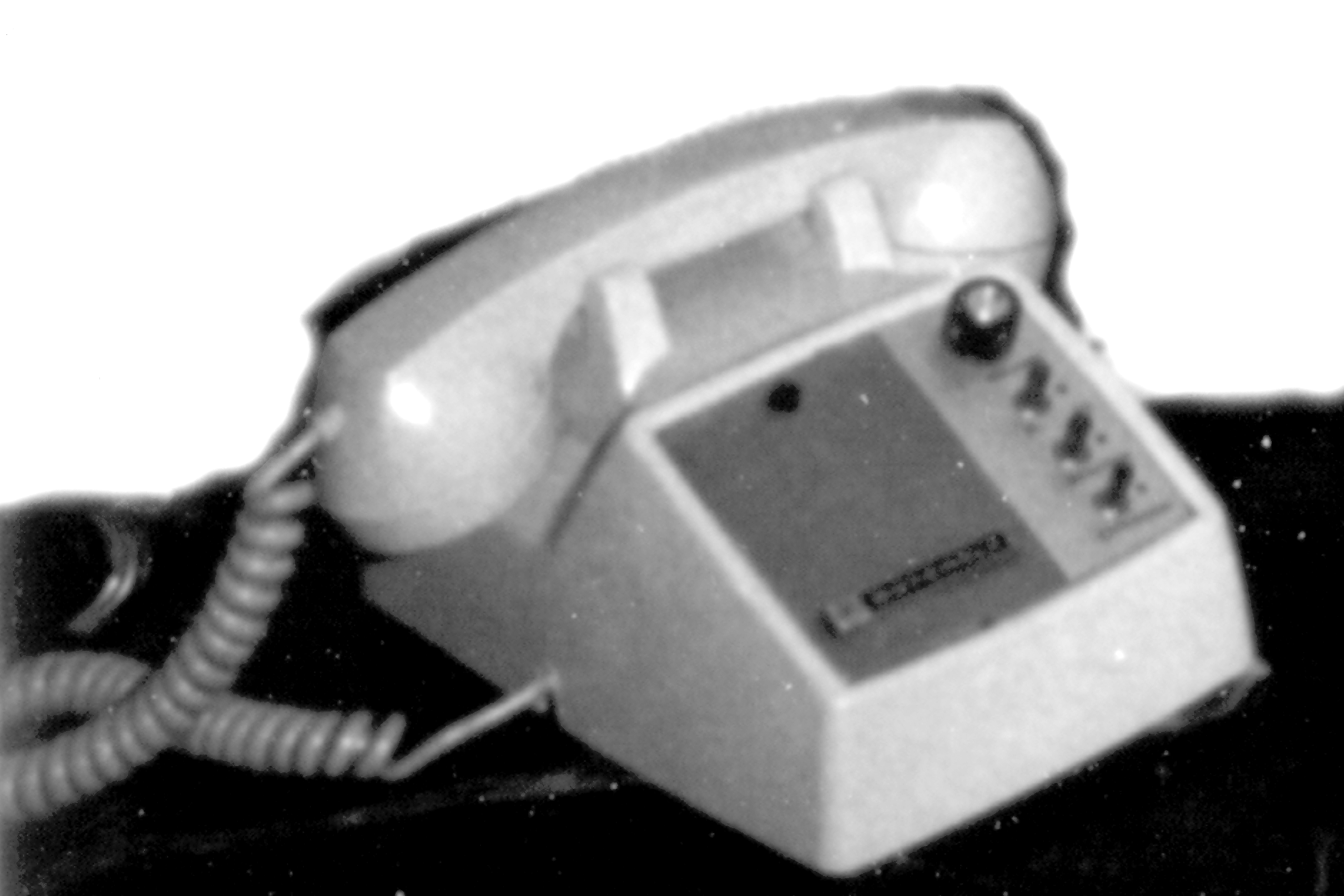
A Motorola T-1300 series remote control is built in a telephone housing. The dial is replaced with a speaker and volume control. This remote control uses a two-wire circuit to control a base station.

In a review of the logging recorder track of the Port Authority repeater, someone arrived early during the incident and began to establish a command post. From the command post in the lobby of the North Tower (1 World Trade Center), the user can be heard trying to transmit using a remote control unit. After several failed attempts to communicate with a user on the channel, the user steps through every channel selection on the remote, trying each one. The recording contains the tone remote control console stepping through all of its eight function tones. Someone says, "... the wireline isn't working", over the Port Authority channel. Something that looks like a Motorola T-1380-series remote is shown in the documentary. The fact that users pressing buttons on the remote control can clearly be heard on the logging recorder shows the transmit audio path was working. The recording does not reveal whether or not the console function tones were keying the transmitter.

Some users in the North Tower lobby interpreted the remote control unit not working as a failure of the entire channel. Other fire units, not knowing the channel had failed, arrived and began using it successfully. The recordings show at least some units were successfully using the repeater to communicate inside the South Tower until the moment it collapsed. The Commission report says the North Tower lobby command may not have worked because of a technical problem, the volume control turned all the way down, or because a button that must be pressed to enable it had not been pushed.

On the audio track, an outside agency, possibly in New Jersey and using a repeater, comes through the receive audio on the Port Authority Repeater 7 system. An ambulance being dispatched by the outside (non-FDNY) agency is heard. This may be what the FDNY had described as interference caused when the repeater was left enabled at all times. The distant user appears to be repeated through the system, (possibly on the same CTCSS tone as was configured in Repeater 7). This appears to be a distant co-channel user on the same input frequency as Repeater 7. It's possible that by the random button pressing, a user sent a function tone that temporarily put the base station in monitor and that's what caused the outside agency's traffic to be heard. This is unlikely because subsequent transmit function tones should have toggled the receiver from monitor back to CTCSS-enabled.

===== Fire Department system =====
An oral history interview revealed the Port Authority UHF radios were normally used at incidents inside the World Trade Center. The interviewee said in normal, day-to-day calls, the WTC staff handed Port Authority UHF radios to firefighters on their arrival and that these radios, "worked all over." This implies, but does not prove, that it was common knowledge among department members that FDNY radios had coverage problems inside the buildings. The 9-11 Commission uses the phrase "performed poorly" to describe FDNY radios during the incident.

Oral history files show that at least four channels were employed at WTC:

- Channel 5, (possibly also called Command 5), was to be used for Command in both Towers.
- Tactical 1 was to be used for Operations in the North Tower.
- Tactical 3 was to be used for Operations in the South Tower.
- Repeater 7, also known as Port Authority Repeater, was also used by some units working in the North Tower.

One officer said a channel named Command 3 was used for the North Tower. To those unfamiliar with the details of the FDNY system, it is unclear whether the interviewee meant Tactical 3 or a fifth channel.

FDNY personnel are seen using radios during the documentary footage of the WTC lobby area. Analysis of these scenes showed the radios all appeared to be receiving properly. Oral history files confirm radio communications were at least partly functional.

A problem that shows up in these types of incidents is that receivers in hand-held radios are subjected to signal levels that are likely to overload the receiver. Several radios may be transmitting within feet of one another on different channels. If overloading occurs, only very strong signals can be received while weaker signals disappear and are not received. The hand held radio receivers shown in the documentary appeared to work properly even though several other hand-held radios were transmitting only feet away. This is a hostile environment and suggests the hand-held equipment used by FDNY had good quality receivers, though in this case, the suggestion is incorrect. Second-hand observation is hardly the proper way to 'test' radio receivers or to distinguish 'good quality' from 'bad' and this is likely a source of continued misunderstanding; particularly when these same radios were operating at higher floors, in closer proximity to, and in direct line-of-sight of digital cellular repeaters. Those repeaters were likely operating at unlicensed power levels, which was a common practice of cellular providers at the time, and continues to this day. Footage reveals intelligible recovered audio coming out of the radios and shows radio users communicating with others. This may not have been true of the entire WTC complex but was true of radio users in the crowded lobby.

Analysis of the 26 FDNY audio CDs showed the radios seemed to transmit into the radio systems okay. Radios calling dispatch got through. Calling units were intelligible. Users spoke with dispatchers. Dispatchers answered in ways that suggest they understood what was said. There were no noisy or truncated transmissions heard on any channel, (the equivalent of a dropped cellular call). This suggests the Fire Department's radio backbone is soundly designed and working properly. It is possible that system coverage problems are present; problems that could have been mitigated had the Command Post radio (with greater transmit power) been used. It is also likely that some transmissions did not reach any of the receivers in the system and therefore would not be a detectable problem when listening to the recordings. At the same time those recordings were made, the cellular system was operating at or near full-capacity, meaning every cellular repeater was transmitting. The dense RF interference environment created in NYC that day was essentially a 'perfect storm'; one in which a radio designed 25 years prior could not possibly contend with.

In some scenes, captured documentary audio showed the channels were busy. In some cases, two or more conversations were taking place over a single radio channel at the same time. Users on Tactical 1 may have been close enough to one another to communicate because signals in proximity to each other would overpower weaker signals. At any incident of this size, there is likely to be some overlapping radio traffic. In the same way that large incidents exhaust all the firefighting vehicles and staff, the radio channel resources may become taxed to their limits. NIST says about one third of the fire department radio transmissions were not complete or not understandable.

Some radio users had selected the wrong channels. For example, on the Repeater 7 channel, a unit was heard to call Manhattan dispatch and Citywide. Although the circumstances that led to the user selecting the wrong channel are not known, this can occur when the user is trapped in darkness or smoke and cannot see the radio. Users will typically try to count steps in a rotary switch channel selector starting from one end of the switch's travel.

A communications van operated by FDNY responded to the incident. Its radio identifier was "Field Comm." A backup van was in use on the day of the incident because the primary van was out-of-service. The backup van was destroyed and audio recordings of tactical channels used at the incident site were lost.

===== FDNY radio programming =====
One annoyance with the fire systems was the presence of unit ID data bursts. These constant squawks, heard at the end of transmissions, are decoded at dispatch to identify the calling radio. The annoyance of the data bursts is a trade-off that could help find a firefighter who has been injured or needs help. It also automatically displays the unit ID at the dispatch console. In most systems, it also saves dispatch personnel from typing the unit ID. They press one key and the calling unit's ID is inserted into the current CAD screen or command line.

Recordings show radios were programmed to send unit ID on tactical channels. Radios accept unit ID on a per-channel basis. When mobile or hand-held radios are programmed, the unit ID encoders should be disabled on all channels where the feature is not used. This saves air time for about two to three syllables of speech per push-to-talk press. For example, unless the communications van or chief's vehicles had push-to-talk unit ID decoders, or the channels were recorded for later analysis where unit IDs were decoded from the recordings, the encoders should be turned off for tactical channels to reduce air time used.

It also sounded like some vehicle radios may have had status buttons using the data bursts. If true, the operator presses a button on the vehicle radio which sends a short data burst to dispatch. Dispatch gets the unit identity and the new status from a data decoder. These can cause interruptions in voice traffic but cut down on total air time required to conduct business because they occupy the channel for less time than it takes to say, "Engine fifty on scene."

===== Tactical 1 =====
This channel was the primary method of communication in the North tower. It was a simplex channel. Users complained it would only reach from the lobby to floors in the thirties. Tactical 1 was a default channel for use at some fire scenes. Some users who realized Repeater 7 was functional switched to that channel and were afforded better coverage than simplex users on Tactical 1. Audio recordings on the documentary film and NIST analysis show Tactical 1 was overloaded with heavy radio traffic. In contrast, the audio CD of Repeater 7 shows the channel was mostly idle.

The 9-11 commission report said a new portable repeater system had been developed to address shortcomings of Tactical 1 at a large incident. The system, called "the post", is carried to an area near the incident and set up for the duration to augment weak signals.

===== Command channel =====
The command channel used by officers at the incident was either called Channel 5 or Command 5 in documentation. Documents suggest the channel had a repeater but it was not clear if the repeater was citywide, installed in the Field Comm van, or housed in a battalion chief's vehicle. Recordings of this channel were lost when the Field Comm van was destroyed. The documentary film and oral history records show the channel being used effectively.

==== Interoperability ====
The federal 9/11 Commission Report included recommendations on communications systems used by police, fire, and emergency medical services (EMS) at the WTC incident. In the report and in appearances on television news programs, commissioners said the capabilities of communications systems lacked the ability to communicate across department lines. That is to say, police units could not communicate with fire units directly by radio. Ambulances could not talk with police units directly by radio. Commission member Lee Hamilton, in several television appearances related to a 2006 book on the topic of the WTC incident, reiterated this factually correct view.

===== Aviation assets =====
An example that was cited by Hamilton: during the incident the Police Department helicopter was unable to communicate with Fire Department units in order to warn them of the towers' imminent collapse. The NIST document suggests the helicopter may have been able to offer several minutes warning. "Several minutes" may have been enough to get some people from the lower floors outside. This warning of imminent collapse went out over at least one police radio channel but there is nothing showing it was relayed to other people or channels. FDNY operates at least two communications vans: one of which was brought to the scene at the WTC incident. The Commission report reveals the primary FDNY van was equipped to talk to NYPD helicopters but the backup van (which had no NYPD helicopter capability) was in use on September 11, 2001.

In practice, many US helicopters used in emergency services are equipped with radios that allow communications on nearly any conventional two-way radio system, so long as the aircrew know the frequency and associated signaling tones. The radios usually have presets, like a car's broadcast radio, that allow some channels to be configured ahead of need. There was no information in the Commission report suggesting NYPD helicopters had such a capability.

===== Cross-department =====
While it is technically possible to implement communications across departments, doing so introduces a host of new training and incident command problems. These are problems that would need to be managed in addition to the existing set of issues present at any large incident. The ability to maintain command, and monitor the safety of, groups working at an incident is diminished if a group of firefighters cannot be reached because they've switched over to the EMS channel. This could cause people to be sent to rescue them when there was no need. Similarly, if the Manhattan EMS dispatcher can't reach an ambulance because they are on one of the fire channels, patient care is affected. New York City Police Commissioner Raymond Kelly, appearing on the Charlie Rose show, expressed his view that the existing radio systems performed satisfactorily during the WTC incident. In his view, the interoperability desired by the 9-11 Commission was not needed.

===== Need for NYPD/FDNY cross-department links? =====
These problems are not new to the World Trade Center incident; cross-department and cross-discipline communication has been a hotly contested and long-identified issue. For example, at the Oklahoma City federal building bombing incident, the inability to communicate among departments was also cited as a problem. Firefighters heard an evacuation order on their radio channel because of the reported presence of a second bomb. Police and EMS workers reportedly did not know of the order.

In Hurricane Katrina's wake, a sergeant in the Louisiana Department of Wildlife and Fisheries appeared on national television to describe not being able to reach persons from other agencies who were assisting with the recovery. She described seeing the people in a nearby boat but not being able to communicate with them.

Even if the technical problems are solved, the issue is more complicated than just adding radio channels or talk groups. It is also a cultural problem. In one local incident, a large number of officers from three police agencies were fielded to search for a violent criminal who had evaded officers from one of the agencies. The officers did not coordinate by switching to a shared radio channel. After the incident, one participant said the users thought their radios were incompatible and did not understand how the shared channel worked. This possibly reflects a training problem or a technology literacy problem. The problem seems to have been remedied since then.

In another instance, a fire agency had thoroughly trained for interoperability scenarios. During an incident where two agencies with different radio channels responded, a decision-maker said personnel from his agency would stay on their own channel. Decision-makers may occasionally act in unpredictable ways, even if technology literate and well-trained. It is not solely a technical problem, but an operational problem as well. Changes to ICS command structure, or operational changes in how the command post for an incident is set up, may produce better results than buying equipment or adding channels. Sometimes there are interoperability problems even where a structure for interoperability exists.

===== ICS =====
One view of the Incident Command System is that units across department lines would communicate with their own representative at the command post or division level. That representative would relay any needs to another department. For example, a fire unit requesting five paramedic ambulances would identify the magnitude of a medical problem to their fire officer at the command post. This request would add to their commander's operational picture of the division or incident command as she called EMS to request the ambulances. Situation awareness is an important part of effective command and is easy to lose at a large incident. Bypassing incident commanders can contribute to a decomposing of command.

===== Trunked systems, commercial services, and cross-department netting =====
One approach to cross-department netting is the capability of some modern trunked systems to provide a function called dynamic regrouping; a feature that Motorola doesn't support in simplex (e.g. 'fireground') operations. It is therefore necessary for a disaster to be near enough the infrastructure to allow for repeater access/operation. Many agencies with Motorola trunked systems already have this capability. The feature allows the dispatch center personnel to send units from different agencies who are responding to the same incident to a common talk group or virtual channel. This assumes the agencies all share a capability to operate over the same trunked radio system, which is rare. In an informal survey of three agencies with trunked systems that included this feature, users at two sites reported they did not think their system included the feature. A representative from a third site said he "...thought they had the feature but never used it." Of the three agencies with the feature, no one knew how to use it. Like other disaster readiness processes, users would have to practice using the feature in order for it to be useful during an incident.

Some agencies use commercial two-way radio as an adjunct to their own communications networks. One professional engineering evaluation of public safety radio systems explains that commercial systems such as Nextel's are not built to the same standards of coverage and non-blocking as public safety trunked systems. Like toy walkie talkies marketed to children, they are usable and helpful for non-urgent communications but should not be considered reliable enough for life safety uses. It is also true that most trunked radio system users are likely to hear busy signals, (error tones showing no channels are available,) for the first time during a large disaster since all systems have a finite capacity.

"We don't want or need trunking" is what Chief Charles Dowd (NYPD) was heard to say at an APCO convention in Orlando (2006). NYPD operates a large, conventional repeater network with many legacy channels in the UHF band; and a technology developed "so a large number of users can share a small number of channels" (e.g. trunking) is clearly unnecessary and a frivolous waste of money.

=== Mobile data terminals ===
The complete 9/11 Commission Report available from the archived version of the 9/11 Commission website

All 911 ambulances and other FDNY vehicles have data terminals, sometimes referred to by staff in recordings and transcripts as MDTs. These terminals are connected to the computer-aided dispatch (CAD) back end or server. They can display text, page through screens describing jobs, and display lists of units assigned to a job.

A thorough analysis of data communications is not possible. What recordings show is that data terminals in at least some field units did not work properly during at least a portion of the incident. At 09:11:14, Division 3 told Manhattan Fire dispatch, referring to the summary screen, "Summary is only giving me a few units. You're going to have to give it to me over the radio. I'm ready to write." This means the terminal was not displaying the entire list of units assigned to Division 3, as it would under normal conditions. The work-around: the Chief had to hand-write the list of units responding. In this one instance, the dispatcher reading the list of about 29 units tied up the Manhattan Fire channel for 53 seconds. During the reading of the list of units responding, one can hear several FDNY units try to interrupt the dispatcher. Their radio traffic was delayed until the entire list was read. This need to read lists of units because of slow or inoperable terminals occurred in at least three or four cases.

It's unclear what caused data delays and incomplete screens on the mobile data terminals. Evidenced by the dispatcher reading the list of units assigned to Division 3, the CAD system was working properly at dispatch positions. At least some field units experienced problems. Possible causes of problems with data terminals in vehicles may have included:

- The radio backbone may have been overloaded because of the unusually high volume of requests for information from field units. Radio networks carrying data traffic have a finite data throughput capacity and can be overloaded. Even a well-designed system has some capacity limit.
- A bottleneck someplace in the network between the radio modem and the CAD system back end may have been overloaded by unusually heavy data traffic.
- Data terminals use a robust error correction protocol. A failure of some part of the radio backbone may have caused reduced radio signals in field units. The bit errors caused by weaker signals may have caused a corresponding increase in resending of data packets. Resent packets reduce overall data throughput.
- The attack placed an unusually heavy load on voice system channels. Interference problems caused by interactions between voice radio channel transmitters and data radio system elements may have caused an increase in bit errors, slowing data throughput.

Data terminals are partly purchased and installed to reduce load on dispatch staff and to reduce traffic on voice channels. When they work properly, they have a significant operational benefit. A data outage during an occurrence of high call traffic can quickly overrun dispatch and voice channel capacity in cases where a routine level of calls for service requires both data terminals and voice channels.

=== New York City Council investigation ===
New York City Council member Eric Gioia introduced a measure to have the Council investigate the issue of FDNY radio problems.

== See also ==
- Collapse of the World Trade Center
