= MD-1 =

MD1, MD-1, may refer to:

== Places ==
- Maryland's 1st congressional district (MD.1), Maryland, USA; a U.S. federal House of Representatives constituency
- Massey Aerodrome (FAA airport code MD1), Massey, Maryland, USA

== Items ==
- IMBEL MD1, an assault rifle
- Ekspress-MD1, Russian geostationary communications satellite
- GVV Dal Molin MD.1 Anfibio Varese, a single engine amphibious flying boat

== Other uses ==
- MD1 (military R&D organisation), aka "Churchill's Toyshop" (Ministry of Defence 1), WW2 British weapons group
- MD 1, a WW2 convoy to Malta
- M/D/1 queue (mathematics) in queueing theory

== See also ==
- MDL (disambiguation)
- MDI (disambiguation)
- MD (disambiguation)
