= MD100 =

MD100 may refer to:

- Maryland Route 100 (MD 100), a state highway in the USA established in the 1970s
- Maryland Route 100 (former), a former state highway in the USA that existed in the early 20th century
- McDonnell Douglas MD-100, a wide-body tri-jet airliner, a variant of the DC-10
- Nineteen Eighty-Four (volume MD100), a 2012 Japanese manga comic visual novel adaptation of the Orwell novel, part of the Manga de Dokuha anthology series
- Nikon MD 100, a component of the Nikon F2 35mm SLR still photographic camera

== See also ==
- MD10 (disambiguation)
- MD1
- MD (disambiguation)
- 100 (disambiguation)
- MDC (disambiguation)
