= MDS =

MDS or M.D.S. may refer to:

== Organizations ==
- Brazilian Ministry of Social Development, former name of a federal ministry in Brazil
- Mennonite Disaster Service, a disaster relief volunteer group
- Movement for Socialist Democracy (Mouvement pour la Démocratie Socialiste), a former political party in Burkina Faso
- Movement of Socialist Democrats (Mouvement des Démocrates Socialistes), a political party in Tunisia
- Social Democratic Movement (Movimiento Demócrata Social), a political party in Bolivia
- Museum Data Service, UK non-profit organisation providing online access to museum collection data

=== Companies ===
- MDS America, a telecommunications company
- MDS Inc., a healthcare company
- Microwave Data Systems, a wireless modem company
- Mohawk Data Sciences Corporation, a computer company

== Science and technology ==
- Minimum detectable signal, a measure of sensitivity
- Molybdenum disulfide, a compound added to some plastics to make parts more slippery
- Multi-Displacement System, a Chrysler automobile technology

=== Computing ===
- .mds, a file extension associated with disk image descriptions
- MDS 2400, a computer
- Mandriva Directory Server, an LDAP server
- Microsoft SQL Server Master Data Services, a database management product
- mds, a daemon in macOS Spotlight
- Microarchitectural Data Sampling, a set of vulnerabilities in Intel processors
- Cisco MDS, a line of Fibre Channel switches

=== Medicine ===
- Main dressing station, a larger military field hospital
- Miller–Dieker syndrome, a neurological disorder
- Minimum Data Set, information collected for US Medicare/Medicaid assessment
- Myelodysplastic syndrome, one of a group of cancers

=== Mathematics ===
- Martingale difference sequence, in probability theory
- Maximum distance separable code, in mathematical coding theory
- Multidimensional scaling, a statistical technique

== Transport ==
- Meridian Southern Railway, in Mississippi, US
- Middle Caicos Airport (IATA code), Turks and Caicos Islands
- Morden South railway station (National Rail station code), London, England
- Madison Municipal Airport (South Dakota), Madison, South Dakota, US

== Other uses ==
- MDs (TV series), a 2002 American medical drama
- Marathon des Sables (MdS), an ultramarathon held in Morocco
- Master of Computer Science, a master's degree in North America
- Master of Dental Surgery
- Master in Data Science
- Mission Design Series, a United States Department of Defense aerospace vehicle designation
- Miriam Defensor Santiago (1945–2016), former senator of the Philippines
- MyDeposits Scotland, Tenancy deposit schemes (Scotland)

== See also ==
- MD (disambiguation)
