= MDL =

MDL may refer to:

== Companies ==
- Mazagon Dock Limited, a company with shipyards in Mumbai, India
- MDL Information Systems, a company formerly named Molecular Design Limited

== Places ==
- Museum of Dartmoor Life, Oakhampton, Devon, England
- Mandalay International Airport (IATA airport code: MDL), Myanmar
- Military Demarcation Line, a truce border line between North and South Korea

== Science and technology ==
- MDL, a metabolite of nicergoline.
- Method detection limit, of a chemical substance

=== Computing ===
- Fayyad & Irani's MDL method, a discretization method
- MDL (programming language), derived from LISP
- .mdl, the file extension for Valve's Source and ID Software's IDTech game engines proprietary model file format
- Microsoft Design Language, a design language
- Minimum description length, a principle for inductive inference in information theory
- Mobile driver's license, a mobile app that replaces a physical driver's license

== Other uses ==
- Moldovan leu, the currency of Moldova
- Multidistrict litigation, US consolidation of complex litigation
- 1550 (Roman numeral), a year
