= C17H22N2O2 =

The molecular formula C_{17}H_{22}N_{2}O_{2} (molar mass: 286.375 g/mol) may refer to:

- Pyridoxiphen
- MDL (drug)
