= MDI =

MDI may refer to:

== Computer science ==
- Media Delivery Index, a metric used in IPTV networks
- Medium-dependent interface (MDI) and medium-dependent interface crossover (MDI-X), types of Ethernet port connections
- Microsoft Document Imaging Format, a proprietary file format
- Mission Data Interface, an interface developed by NUWC Keyport
- Multiple-document interface, a type of software application interface
- Multi-Draw Indirect, a rendering technique
- Mean decrease in impurity feature importance (machine learning)

== Health ==
- Major Depression Inventory, a self-report mood inventory developed by the World Health Organization
- Metered-dose inhaler, a device that helps deliver a specific amount of medication to the lungs
- Multiple drug intake, an unnatural cause of death
- Multiple Daily Injections, a technique of intensive insulinotherapy
- Mental Development Index, a measure of the cognitive abilities of infants and part of the Bayley Scales of Infant Development

== Organizations ==
- Management Development Institute, a business school in Gurgaon, India
- Merchants Distributors, Inc., a wholesale grocery store distributor based in Hickory, North Carolina
- Movement for Democracy and Independence, a former political party in the Central African Republic
- Motor Development International, a compressed air car maker

== Other uses ==
- Mount Desert Island, an island off the coast of the U.S. state of Maine
- Methylene diphenyl diisocyanate, a chemical
- Michelson Doppler Imager, an instrument on board the SOHO spacecraft
- 1501, in Roman numerals
- Medically determinable impairment, a factor in establishing disability under Social Security Disability Insurance and Supplemental Security Income

== See also ==
- MD1 Ministry of Defence 1, a British weapon research and development organisation of the Second World War
