= MDC =

MDC may refer to:

== Arts ==
- Macau Design Centre, an art center in Macau
- MDC (band) (Millions of Dead Cops), an American rock band
- M.D.C. - Maschera di cera, a 1997 Italian horror film
- Marinette Dupain-Cheng, the protagonist of Miraculous: Tales of Ladybug & Cat Noir

== Chemistry and biology ==
- Methylene dichloride, also known as dichloromethane (DCM)
- Macrophage-derived chemokine (CCL22), a human cytokine
- Metalloproteinase-like disintegrin-like cysteine-rich proteins, another name for the ADAM protein family
- Biotin-independent malonate decarboxylase, an enzyme
- Methylenedioxycathinone, a synthetic stimulant of the cathinone class
- Myeloid dendritic cell, a subtype of the dendritic immune cell

== Computing and electronics ==
- MDC-600 and MDC-1200, an AFSK mobile data format used in Motorola two-way radios
- Message digest code, cryptographic hash value
- Metadata controller, which manages file locking, space allocation and data access authorization in a storage area network (SAN)
- Mobile data computer, law enforcement mobile terminal / computer (MDT/MDC)
- Mobile daughter card
- Modification Detection Code
- MDN Web Docs (formerly Mozilla Developer Center), a Mozilla website for developer documentation.
- Multiple description coding, coding technique
- Merkle–Damgård construction, a construction used by many hash functions
- Mapped Diagnostic Context, a Log4j mechanism used to pass additional information to the underlying logger to provide better logging information on a per thread basis
- Micro data center, a containerized self-sufficient data center

== Geography ==
- Manado Airport, Indonesian airport
- More developed country
- Model dwellings company

== Organizations ==
- Mater Dei College, Tubigon, Bohol, Philippines
- Max Delbrück Center for Molecular Medicine, Berlin
- McDonnell Douglas, American aerospace manufacturing corporation which was acquired by Boeing in 1997
- MDC Holdings, American home builder company
- MDC Partners, an American advertising and marketing holding company
- Medicaid Dental Center, chain of dental clinics in North Carolina
- Metropolitan Detention Centers, US federal prisons
- Metropolitan District Commission, defunct Massachusetts organization now part of the DCR
- Metropolitan District Commission, Connecticut municipal corporation and utilities provider
- Missouri Department of Conservation
- Miami-Dade College, Miami, Florida
- Movement for Democratic Change (pre-2005), a former Zimbabwean political party (split into MDC-T and MDC-N)
- Movement for Democratic Change (2018), a Zimbabwean political party formed as a merger of parties that descended from the original MDC
- Movement for Democratic Change – Tsvangirai (MDC-T), a Zimbabwean political party
- Movement for Democratic Change – Ncube (MDC-N), a former Zimbabwean political party (merged into UMDC)
- Movement for Democratic Change Alliance, an electoral bloc formed in Zimbabwe in 2017
- MUMPS Development Committee, an organization that defines the MUMPS computer language and created the ANSI and ISO standards for MUMPS.
- Museums Discovery Centre, in Sydney, Australia, museum collection storage facility for Powerhouse Museum, Australian Museum and Sydney Living Museums
- United Movement for Democratic Change, a Zimbabwean political party founded in 2014

== Sports ==
- Mon-Dak Conference, junior college conference in Montana and North Dakota
- Miami Dolphins Cheerleaders, professional cheerleading squad of the Miami Dolphins
- Michael Dal Colle, professional ice hockey winger for the New York Islanders of the National Hockey League

== Other uses ==
- 1600 (number), a Roman numeral
- Manuel de Codage, abbr. MdC, a system for transliterating ancient Egyptian hieroglyphs
- Major Diagnostic Category, the groupings of the roughly 751 Medicare Severity Diagnosis Related Groups (MS-DRGs)
