= Microwave Data Systems =

Wireless modem company

GE MDS / MDS / Microwave Data Systems
- Type: Wireless communications
- Industry: RF Communications
- Founded: 1985
- Headquarters: 175 Science Pkwy Rochester, NY, US
- Products: Point-to-point and point-to-multipoint radios; Wireless routers and modems; Redundant base stations; Outdoor enclosures; Network monitoring software
- Services: RF / Radio propagation studies; RF / radio site surveys; Antenna and radio installation; Cybersecurity design; Networking design
- Revenue: Undisclosed
- Parent: General Electric
- Website: www.gegridsolutions.com/communications/services.htm

GE MDS (formerly Microwave Data Systems, Inc., MDS) is an American company that designs, manufactures, and sells Wireless communications equipment for the industrial market.

== History ==
Microwave Data Systems (MDS) was originally part of California Microwave (CalMic). As California Microwave consolidated and sold off businesses, CalMic changed its name to Adaptive Broadband. Both California Microwave and Adaptive Broadband were public companies. MDS was sold to Moseley Associates and operated as a private company for some time. General Electric's Multilin division inside GE Consumer and Industrial purchased Microwave Data Systems in 2007 and changed the official business name to "GE MDS, LLC." GE MDS has operated under the following GE Divisions / Operating Units: GE Consumer and Industrial, GE Industrial, GE Enterprise Solutions, GE Digital Energy, GE Metering and Sensing, GE Energy Management, GE Grid Solutions, GE Automation & Controls, GE Renewable Energy, and GE Grid Solutions (again).

Currently GE MDS operates as a business unit inside GE Renewable Energy / GE Grid Solutions.

GE MDS is headquartered in Rochester, NY. All research and development and manufacturing is done in Rochester, NY (USA). MDS was a subsidiary of Moseley Associates and was acquired, in January 2007, by GE Multilin which was a division of General Electric. The company then became known as GE MDS, LLC. Prior to being a subsidiary of Moseley, Microwave Data Systems was a part of California Microwave.

GE MDS Products include point-to-point and point-to-multipoint radios that operate in the licensed and unlicensed (ISM band) frequency bands under 6GHz. The company is known particularly for long range communications, interference rejection, industrial quality, and high reliability. Customer applications are typically industrial and long range: electric power distribution, oil and gas wellhead monitoring, monitoring oil and gas pipeline transport, railroad locomotive and wayside communications, water/wastewater monitoring, etc.

== See also ==
- Wireless modem
- Wireless
- Public utility
- Radio
- 4G
- LTE (telecommunication)
- SCADA
- Gas flow computer
