= Nicergoline =

Chemical compound

Clinical data
- Trade names: Sermion
- Other names: [(8β)-10-Methoxy-1,6-dimethylergolin-8-yl]methyl 5-bromopyridine-3-carboxylate
- AHFS/Drugs.com: International Drug Names
- Pregnancy category: Not recommended
- Routes of administration: By mouth, intramuscular, intravenous
- Drug class: α_{1}-Adrenergic receptor antagonist
- ATC code: C04AE02 (WHO)

Legal status
- Legal status: EU: Rx-only

Pharmacokinetic data
- Bioavailability: <5%
- Protein binding: >90%
- Metabolism: Extensive first-pass metabolism
- Metabolites: MDL; MMDL
- Elimination half-life: 13–20 hours

Identifiers
- IUPAC name: [(6aR,9R,10aS)-10a-methoxy-4,7-dimethyl-6a,8,9,10-tetrahydro-6H-indolo[4,3-fg]quinolin-9-yl]methyl 5-bromopyridine-3-carboxylate
- CAS Number: 27848-84-6
- PubChem CID: 34040
- DrugBank: DB00699
- ChemSpider: 31373
- UNII: JCV8365FWN
- KEGG: D01290
- ChEMBL: ChEMBL1372950
- CompTox Dashboard (EPA): DTXSID7045607
- ECHA InfoCard: 100.044.252

Chemical and physical data
- Formula: C_{24}H_{26}BrN_{3}O_{3}
- Molar mass: 484.394 g·mol^{−1}
- 3D model (JSmol): Interactive image
- SMILES: Brc1cc(cnc1)C(=O)OC[C@@H]3C[C@]4(OC)c5cccc2c5c(cn2C)C[C@H]4N(C3)C
- InChI: InChI=1S/C24H26BrN3O3/c1-27-13-17-8-21-24(30-3,19-5-4-6-20(27)22(17)19)9-15(12-28(21)2)14-31-23(29)16-7-18(25)11-26-10-16/h4-7,10-11,13,15,21H,8-9,12,14H2,1-3H3/t15-,21-,24+/m1/s1; Key:YSEXMKHXIOCEJA-FVFQAYNVSA-N

Nicergoline, sold under the brand name Sermion among others, is an ergot derivative used to treat senile dementia and other disorders with vascular origins. Internationally it has been used for frontotemporal dementia as well as early onset in Lewy body dementia and Parkinson's dementia. It decreases vascular resistance and increases arterial blood flow in the brain, improving the utilization of oxygen and glucose by brain cells. It has similar vasoactive properties in other areas of the body, particularly the lungs. Unlike many other ergolines, such as ergotamine, nicergoline is not associated with cardiac fibrosis.

It is used for vascular disorders such as cerebral thrombosis and atherosclerosis, arterial blockages in the limbs, Raynaud's disease, vascular migraines, and retinopathy.

Nicergoline has been registered in over fifty countries and has been used for more than three decades for the treatment of cognitive, affective, and behavioral disorders of older people.

== Medical uses ==
Nicergoline is used in the following cases:

- Acute and chronic cerebral metabolic-vascular disorders (cerebral arteriosclerosis, thrombosis and cerebral embolism, transitory cerebral ischaemia). Acute and chronic peripheral metabolic-vascular disorders (organic and functional arteriopathies of the limbs), Raynaud's disease and other syndromes caused by altered peripheral irrigation.
- Migraines of vascular origin
- Coadjutant therapy in clinical situations accompanied by platelet hyper-aggregability, arterial tension.
- Corio-retinal vascular disorders: diabetic retinopathy, macular degeneration and retinal angiosclerosis
- Oto-vestibular problems of a vascular nature: dizziness, auditory hallucinations, hypoacusis.

Dosages for known conditions are usually administered at 5–10 mg three times a day, however anti-aging preventative purposes may want to consider 5 mg once or twice a day more adequate.

== Contraindications ==
Persons suffering from acute bleeding, myocardial infarction (heart conditions), hypertension, bradycardia or using alpha or beta receptor agonists should consult with their physician before use. Although toxicology studies have not shown nicergoline to have any teratogenic effect, the use of this medicine during pregnancy should be limited to those cases where it is absolutely necessary.

On 28 June 2013, the European Medicines Agency recommended restricting the use of medicines containing ergot derivatives, including nicergoline. They stated that "these medicines should no longer be used to treat several conditions involving blood circulation problems or problems with memory and sensation, or to prevent migraine headaches, since the risks are greater than the benefits in these indications. This is based on a review of data showing an increased risk of fibrosis (formation of excess connective tissue that can damage organs and body structures) and ergotism (symptoms of ergot poisoning, such as spasms and obstructed blood circulation) with these medicines." However, only a subset of ergolines are associated with fibrosis and evidence suggests that nicergoline does not carry the same fibrotic risk like other ergoline derivatives such as ergotamine.

Nicergoline is considered unsafe in porphyria.

== Side effects ==
The side effects of nicergoline are usually limited to nausea, hot flushes, mild gastric upset, hypotension and dizziness. At high drug dosages, bradycardia, increased appetite, agitation, diarrhea and perspiration were reported. Most of the available literature suggests that the side effects of nicergoline are mild and transient.

== Interactions ==
Nicergoline is known to enhance the cardiac depressive effects of propranolol. At high dosages, it is advisable to seek one's physician's guidance if combining with potent vasodilators such as bromocriptine, Ginkgo biloba, picamilon, vinpocetine or xantinol nicotinate.

== Pharmacology ==
=== Pharmacodynamics ===
Nicergoline activities
Target	Affinity (K_{i}, nM)
α_{1}	0.03–0.2 (IC_{50})
α_{1A}	0.13
α_{1B}	7.9
α_{2}	750 (IC_{50})
α_{2A}	185
α_{2B}	2,699
α_{2C}	362
β	3,000 (IC_{50})
5-HT_{1}	120
5-HT_{1A}	6 (IC_{50})
5-HT_{2}	45–230
5-HT_{2A}	23.4
5-HT_{3}	7,700 (IC_{50})
DA	300–6,000 (IC_{50})
mACh	9,000 (IC_{50})
Notes: The smaller the value, the more avidly the drug binds to the site. Proteins are rodent or human. Refs:

Nicergoline is an ergot alkaloid derivative that acts as a potent and selective α_{1A}-adrenergic receptor antagonist. The IC_{50} of nicergoline in vitro has been reported to be 0.2 nM. The primary action of nicergoline is to increase arterial blood flow by vasodilation. Furthermore, it is known that nicergoline inhibits platelet aggregation. Studies have shown that nicergoline also increases nerve growth factor in the aged brain. In addition to the α_{1A}-adrenergic receptor, nicergoline is an antagonist of the serotonin 5-HT_{1A} receptor (IC_{50} = 6 nM) and shows moderate affinity for serotonin 5-HT_{2} and α_{2}-adrenergic receptors and low affinity for the dopamine D_{1} and D_{2} and muscarinic acetylcholine M_{1} and M_{2} receptors.

=== Pharmacokinetics ===
The major metabolites of nicergoline include MMDL and MDL. These metabolites show low or no affinity for adrenergic, serotonin, dopamine, or acetylcholine receptors.

== Society and culture ==
=== Generic names ===
Nicergoline is the generic name of the drug and its INN, USAN, BAN, and DCF.

=== Brand names ===
In some countries, Sermion is marketed by Viatris after Upjohn was spun off from Pfizer.

== See also ==
- Substituted ergoline
