= MDX =

MDX may refer to:

== Computing ==
- MDX, the 3D graphics file format used by Blizzard Entertainment
- MDX, the default disc image file format of DAEMON Tools
- Managed DirectX, an API for working with DirectX on Microsoft's .NET platform
- MultiDimensional eXpressions, a query language for OLAP databases

== Other ==
- Acura MDX, a sport utility vehicle introduced by Honda
- Mdx mouse, a popular model for studying Duchenne muscular dystrophy
- Miami-Dade Expressway Authority, an organization that toll expressways
- Middlesex, county in England, Chapman code
- Middlesex University, which uses the internet domain name mdx.ac.uk
- Mountain Dew MDX, an energy drink
