= MDL (drug) =

Clinical data
- Other names: 10-methoxydihydrolysergol; 10-α-methoxy-9,10-dihydrolysergol
- ATC code: None

Identifiers
- IUPAC name: [(6aR,9R)-10a-methoxy-7-methyl-4,6,6a,8,9,10-hexahydroindolo[4,3-fg]quinolin-9-yl]methanol
- CAS Number: 35121-60-9
- PubChem CID: 160245
- ChemSpider: 140843
- CompTox Dashboard (EPA): DTXSID00956558

Chemical and physical data
- Formula: C_{17}H_{22}N_{2}O_{2}
- Molar mass: 286.375 g·mol^{−1}
- 3D model (JSmol): Interactive image
- SMILES: CN1C[C@@H](CC2([C@H]1CC3=CNC4=CC=CC2=C34)OC)CO
- InChI: InChI=1S/C17H22N2O2/c1-19-9-11(10-20)7-17(21-2)13-4-3-5-14-16(13)12(8-18-14)6-15(17)19/h3-5,8,11,15,18,20H,6-7,9-10H2,1-2H3/t11-,15-,17?/m1/s1; Key:JGQZSBLQHCTAJF-SCFZEWGBSA-N

MDL (short for Methoxy Dihydro Lysergol) is a metabolite of the drug nicergoline.

It is member of the ergoline family and is a dehydrogenated and methoxylated lysergol (a lysergol in which the double bond between carbon atoms 9 and 10 has been hydrogenated and a methoxy group is attached to the 10th carbon atom in the α-configuration).

MDL is formed as a result of the N-demethylation of the metabolite MMDL; the enzyme CYP2D6 plays a key role in this chemical reaction, and its individual functional activity determines the efficiency with which this drug is metabolised in the body.

== Pharmacology ==
=== Pharmacodynamics ===
Little is known about the serotonergic activity of MDL; however, there is a study evaluating the antioxidant activity of nicergoline metabolites, in which MDL and MMDL protect tissues from oxidation, prevent a drop in glutathione levels and halt lipid peroxidation. In combination with nicergoline, it stimulates astrocytes, causing them to release protective growth factors (TGF-beta and GDNF); however, the metabolite MMDL did not exhibit this effect. It mildly stimulates the synthesis of noradrenaline in the brain and has a weak (low) affinity for alpha-1-adrenoceptors.

== See also ==
- Substituted ergoline
