= MDC-1200 =

Two-way radio data system

MDC-1200 sounds
leading push-to-talk ID with data muting.

MDC-1200 sounds
leading push-to-talk ID without data muting.

MDC (Motorola Data Communications), also known as Stat-Alert, MDC-1200 and MDC-600, is a two-way radio low-speed data system developed by Motorola (now Motorola Solutions) in which short digital bursts are sent over a radio system's voice channel. The two variants are distinguished by their signalling rate: MDC-600 operates at 600 bits per second and MDC-1200 at 1,200 bit/s. A given system uses one rate or the other. Motorola's patents describe the 600 bit/s variant as using coherent phase-shift keying on a 1,500 Hz carrier, while the 1,200 bit/s variant uses audio frequency-shift keying with mark and space tones of 1,200 Hz and 1,800 Hz.

MDC signaling includes a number of features: unit ID, status buttons, emergency button, selective inhibit, radio check, and selective calling. These features are programmable and could be used in any combination desired by the user. They are typically incorporated in high-end analog FM commercial and public safety radios made by Motorola and other manufacturers. In addition to Motorola, at least two other companies make compatible base station decoders for MDC-1200.

Motorola radios with MDC options have an option allowing the radio to filter out data bursts from the receive audio. Instead of hearing the AFSK data, the user hears a short chirp from the radio speaker each time a data burst occurs. (The user must turn on this feature in the radio's option programming settings).

A general option setting for all MDC systems is to enable or disable an acknowledgement (ack) data packet. A single bit in each packet determines whether the receiving unit acknowledges it; when acknowledgement is requested and none is received, the sending unit retransmits a preset number of times. For example, following a selective call, the called radio replies with an "ack". This "handshake" confirms the called radio is powered on, and has received and decoded the call. The encoder beeps to confirm the call got through to the target. In computer-aided dispatch, the encoder/decoder may pass the ack on busy channels to the dispatch computer system, flagging the selective call as having been received by the mobile radio or automatically marking the time of call. The disadvantage of using an ack on busy channels is that more air time is used.

== Signal format ==
Each transmission carries a 32-bit data packet. Before transmission, the packet is expanded to 176 bits: a 16-bit cyclic redundancy check is appended to form a 48-bit inner code word, which is then passed through a half-rate convolutional encoder. A 24-bit preamble of alternating ones and zeros, used by the receiver for clock recovery, and a 40-bit fixed synchronization code word are prepended to the result.

A receiver achieves bit synchronization from the 24-bit preamble, then continuously compares the last 40 received bits against the fixed synchronization word; in the patent's preferred embodiment a match of 35 of the 40 bits is treated as synchronization. The 112 encoded data bits immediately following are then stored and decoded. Through use of error-correcting code, the original 32-bit packet can be recovered in the event of a corrupted burst. Transmission of the 176-bit packet takes approximately 290 milliseconds at the 600 bit/s rate.

Within the packet, bits 0 through 15 form the address field, bits 24 through 28 carry an operation code, bit 19 indicates whether the packet is inbound or outbound, bit 30 is the acknowledge/no-acknowledge flag, and bit 31 distinguishes a command packet from a free-format data packet. Free-format packets carry 31 bits of user data each and may be concatenated, preceded by a command-type header packet identifying the source or destination.

== Unit ID or push-to-talk ID ==
Many MDC-1200 systems utilize the unit ID option. With each push-to-talk press, the radio sends a data burst identifying the sending radio. The 16-bit address field of the data packet is partitioned into four hexadecimal digits, providing up to 65,536 unique addresses; for inbound packets the address identifies the sending unit. Every radio would have a unique four-digit ID, (for example: 0423 or 5990).

Unit ID can be sent as leading or trailing a voice message. In the leading option, the data burst is sent at the moment a user presses the radio's push-to-talk button. An option can be set to make the radio's speaker emit a tone for the length of the unit ID data. This reminds a user to wait until the data has been sent before talking. The leading unit ID takes slightly more air time than a trailing ID because of a header tone and the need to delay the data burst to allow time for CTCSS decoders and voting comparators to open an audio path to the decoder. A default delay is defined with the unit ID option. To adjust for time delay variations in each individual system, radios can be programmed to delay the sending of a radio's unit ID data by up to hundreds of milliseconds within a range. In the trailing option, the data packet is sent at the moment the microphone button is released. This avoids timing issues as the audio path to the base station is already open.

The standard Motorola encoder-decoder has a display which shows the most recent four-digit, push-to-talk ID. A printer can be connected. It would print the unit ID and the time it was received based on the decoder's internal clock.

In computer-aided dispatch (CAD), the four-digit ID is passed to the CAD and may be translated to a local name for the unit. For example, a tow truck with an identifier "Downtown 6" logging on at the beginning of a shift may call the dispatcher and say, "Downtown 6, in service: vehicle radio 0455, hand-held 0771." The CAD computer would translate any push-to-talk ID from either 0771 or 0455 to display "Downtown 6" on the CAD screen.

== Emergency button ==
The emergency button option designates a button on hand-held or vehicle radios which sends the MDC-1200 unit ID with an emergency flag appended. The decoder notes the unit ID but interprets this data packet as an emergency message rather than a unit ID.

Options allow emergency messages to always be sent over a specific channel rather than the channel set by the operator using the channel selector. For example, a system with two channels could be programmed to send all emergency messages on channel 2. This reduces interruption of the primary dispatch channel if an emergency button is pressed.

The default setup for emergency buttons is for the sending radio to be completely silent when the emergency button is pressed. The radio will silently send the emergency message, with the four-digit unit ID embedded, three times. In hand-held radios, this increases the probability of at least one packet getting through.

In a computer-aided dispatch (CAD) environment, the button press may pop a dialog box or activate some other attention-getting device. For example, on a screen showing status summary of all units, the unit with an activated emergency button may change colors or flash.

== Status buttons ==
Some MDC-equipped radios have buttons which allow pre-defined status messages to be sent to the base station decoder. The status messages decode as generic messages, (for example: status 1 or status 8). These messages are user-defined. Typically, key caps on the status button for status 8 may be marked with the user-defined definition of the status such as available. The base station may respond to a button press with a voice acknowledgment, for example, "Downtown 6, available."

In a CAD environment, the message status 8 may be translated by the CAD system to a meaning such as available. Status 1 might mean starting a meal break. Key caps on the radio's status buttons may be engraved with their user-defined status. The unit's status changes at the moment the button press is received. This helps take a load off the dispatcher because the status change is logged automatically. This happens even though the dispatcher may be talking on the telephone. In systems where the dispatcher is often overloaded, the use of status buttons may slightly reduce the work load and may reduce voice message traffic on a channel.

If the acknowledgment packets are enabled, every status button press gets a handshake packet in response from the base station encoder-decoder. The radio where a status button was pressed will normally beep to confirm the decoder's ack for a status button press.

== Selective inhibit ==
In the event a radio is stolen, or a user's permission to access the radio system is revoked, a data packet can be sent to the radio's ID to disable the radio. This prevents the radio from transmitting or receiving until either an un-inhibit packet is sent to the radio or in some cases re-programmed using the appropriate service software. Some literature refers to this feature as 'stunning' and 'un-stunning' the radio, or a 'radiokill'.

== Radio check ==
A request can be sent to the radio to determine if it is turned on, on a specific frequency, or within range. The radio will respond with an 'ack' if it hears the request containing its individual ID. The radio can also be programmed to ignore these packets and not acknowledge them. It can also be programmed to perform this acknowledgement 'silently' (the radio user never knows that his radio has been 'pinged').

== Selective calling ==
MDC-systems have an option for selective calling. By pressing a series of keys on the encoder-decoder, the base station operator can send a data packet that activates a lighted indicator or makes the radio beep. On some radio models with alphanumeric displays, the display may flash CALL until a reset button is pressed. On radio models with ten key pads, mobile radios may be programmed to selectively call one another in this manner. In order to call a radio, the calling party must know the four-digit MDC identity of the radio to be called.

In a CAD environment, a tow truck could be automatically called at the moment the driver was dispatched to respond to a call for service. The CAD system could manage the four-digit IDs so that the user did not need to know them.

== Patents and manufacturers ==
MDC signalling is described in a series of Motorola patents filed between 1981 and 1983. The patents have since expired.

Because the protocol was proprietary, third-party support was initially limited. Compatible encoders, decoders and dispatch display units have since been produced by other manufacturers, including Midian Electronics and Cimarron Technologies. Some units are self-contained displays; others are interface boxes taking receiver audio and providing an RS-232 serial output.

MDC-1200 encode and decode is also built into radios from other manufacturers, including Icom and Kenwood.
