= MD =

MD or variants may refer to:

== Academic degrees ==
- Doctor of Medicine (Latin: Medicinae Doctor)
- Doctor of Medicine in Ayurveda
- MD (Homeopathy)

== Arts, entertainment and media ==
- Main droite or mano destra ('right hand'), in music terminology
- Music director
- MDs (TV series), a 2002 American medical drama
- Materiali e discussioni per l'analisi dei testi classici ('Materials and discussions for the analysis of classical texts'), an Italian journal
- MDTV (Indonesian TV network)

== Businesses and organizations ==
- Managing director, or chief executive officer, of an organization
- Madagascar Airlines, IATA airline code MD
- MD, aircraft model prefix of McDonnell Douglas
- MD Helicopters, American aerospace manufacturer
- MD Discount, Italian discount supermarket

== Places ==
- Moldova, ISO country code MD
- Maryland, United States, US postal abbreviation MD

== Science and technology ==
=== Chemistry and physics ===
- Mendelevium, symbol Md, a chemical element
- Methyldichloroarsine, a chemical warfare agent
- Membrane distillation, a thermally driven separation process
- Millidarcy (mD), a unit of fluid permeability
- Molecular dynamics, a computer simulation method

=== Computing ===
- .md, Internet top-level domain for Moldova
- Markdown, a lightweight markup language, file extension .md
- MiniDisc, a discontinued erasable magneto-optical disc-based data storage format
- md, or mkdir, the "make directory" command
- Multiple device, as in Linux mdadm device driver

=== Medicine ===
- Ménière's disease, a disorder of the inner ear
- Muscular dystrophy, a group of diseases involving breakdown of skeletal muscles
- Muscle dysmorphia, a subtype of the body dysmorphic disorder

=== Other uses in science and technology ===
- Mean absolute difference, a measure of statistical dispersion
- Mesoscale discussion, in Storm Prediction Centers and Weather Prediction Centers
- Earthquake duration magnitude, M_{d}

== Other uses ==
- MD 20/20, a brand of fortified wine
- MD, 1500 in Roman numerals
- Majority decision, in full-contact combat sports
- 🅫 (marque déposée 'trademark', alternatively rendered ^{MD}), a Unicode compound superscript character
- Match Director in International Practical Shooting Confederation match
- Md, an alternative for Muhammad (name) or Mohammed

== See also ==
- DM (disambiguation)
- MDS (disambiguation)
