= Link control =

Link control may refer to:

- Data link layer, also known as data link control (DLC)
- High-Level Data Link Control (HDLC)
- Synchronous Data Link Control (SDLC)
