= Multi-Drop Bus/Internal Communication Protocol =

Networking protocol

Multi-Drop Bus/Internal Communication Protocol (MDB/ICP) is the latest, US-European iteration of a multidrop bus computer networking protocol used within the vending machine industry, currently published by the American National Automatic Merchandising Association and supported by the European Vending Association and the European Vending Machine Manufacturers Association. It is based on earlier protocols (also known as MDB in the US) dating back to at least the early 1990s.

== Mechanism ==
The multidrop bus used by vending machine controllers to communicate with the vending machine's components, such as a currency detector, is also called MDB (for Multi-Drop Bus). In use since the 1980s, it is now an open standard of the National Automatic Merchandising Association, or NAMA. The devices communicate in a single-master, multiple-slave configuration using the MDB protocol, which is based on a Motorola 9-bit UART implemented as an 8-bit data value with an additional mode bit. The mode bit differentiates between address and data bytes. The master sends messages containing one address byte and a variable number of data bytes. The bus slave devices listen for an address, and if it matches their address that slave device will process the message and respond to the master. Though 9-bit compliant UARTs are not popular in PCs, they can be found in many microcontrollers.

== Connection ==
The physical connection is realized as a standardized six conductor cable carrying power and data.

MDB Connector Pin-out
Pin	Name
1	+34 VDC
2	DC Power Return
3	N/C (sometimes ground)
4	Master Receive
5	Master Transmit
6	Communications Common

Power is supplied over a pair of conductors. Voltage is specified as 34VDC nominal, allowing for a maximum range of 20VDC to 42.5VDC. Due to the proliferation of 24VDC power supplies and devices, the voltage supply is frequently driven with 24VDC to allow the use of more commonly available equipment.

Data is carried over a bidirectional serial bus with a fixed data rate of 9600 baud. The data travels on two wires, with a third wire for reference. Master Transmit (sometimes simplified to TX) connects the master to all slaves, Master Receive (sometimes simplified to RX) connects all slaves to the master, and Communications Common which provides the 0V reference for the data signals. Both TX and RX are powered exclusively by the master device and isolated at each receiver with an opto-isolator. Master Transmit is driven by the master, supplying 5V when active and 0v when inactive. Master Receive is pulled up to 5V via a pull-up resistor on the master and is driven to 0V by a slave when active and idles at 5V when inactive.

Though the communication signals are isolated in the cabling, the devices may not be isolated from each other as they likely share the same power bus. Some devices, however, may have alternate power supplies, especially devices with motors and high current needs such as bill acceptors or currency detector devices.

== Devices ==
The MDB specification defines fixed addresses for devices, depending on their function. Addresses are standardized so any device from one manufacturer can be replaced with a similar device from another manufacturer, solving the interoperability issues that early vending machines suffered from. Note that the address byte contains the address of the slave as the upper five bits, as well as a command as the lower three bits, thus only the upper five bits are shown in this table.

MDB Peripheral Addresses
Address		Device
Binary	Hexadecimal	Device
00000xxx	00	VMC
00001xxx	08	Changer
00010xxx	10	Cashless Device #1
00011xxx	18	Communications Gateway
00100xxx	20	Display
00101xxx	28	Energy Management System
00110xxx	30	Bill Validator
00111xxx	38	Reserved for Future Standard Peripheral
01000xxx	40	Universal Satellite Device #1
01001xxx	48	Universal Satellite Device #2
01010xxx	50	Universal Satellite Device #3
01011xxx	58	Coin Hopper or Tube – Dispenser 1
01100xxx	60	Cashless Device #2
01101xxx	68	Age Verification Device
01101xxx	70	Coin Hopper or Tube – Dispenser 2
01111xxx	78	Reserved for Future Standard Peripherals
...	...	...
11011xxx	D8	Reserved for Future Standard Peripherals
11100xxx	E0	Experimental Peripheral #1
11101xxx	E8	Experimental Peripheral #2
11110xxx	F0	Vending Machine Specific Peripheral #1
11111xxx	F8	Vending Machine Specific Peripheral #2

Experimental Peripheral addresses are temporary addresses manufacturers use when developing a new MDB/ICP device and are only to be used during development. Once the new device is approved, the device will be given an official peripheral address.

Vending Machine Specific Peripheral addresses are for non-standard devices installed in a machine. These addresses can be used in the field when a machine needs devices that don't fit into a standard device category.

== History ==
MDB originated as a proprietary bus used by CoinCo for their coin-acceptors in the late 1980s and was deployed in high volume in vending machines for Coca-Cola. Coke forced CoinCo to open-source it in 1992 to increase competition, and NAMA released the first version of the standard in 1995, allowing other vendors to compete for the coin-acceptor portion of the vending machines (CoinCo and Mars were the 2 major suppliers in North America at the time) and also enabled alternative payment schemes (e.g. Smartcard based) to be connected to existing vending machines.

Bus addressing is based on the device type only, which allows for a very simple protocol stack, as no initial enumeration needs to be performed.

=== Timeline ===
- August, 2019: Version 4.3 released (seventh MDB release)
- February, 2011: Version 4.2 released (sixth MDB/ICP release)
- July, 2010: Version 4.1 (fifth MDB/ICP release)
- April, 2009: Version 4.0 (fourth MDB/ICP release)
- March, 2003: Version 3.0 (third MDB/ICP release)
- October, 2002: Version 2.0 (second MDB/ICP release)
- October, 1998: Version 1.0 (first MDB/ICP release)
- 1994: Revised EVMMA document.
- August, 1994: Revised NAMA document.
- 1994: Original EVMMA document.
- October, 1993: Original NAMA document.
- Earlier US versions were known as MDB rather than MDB/ICP. Prior to this, it was allegedly a proprietary protocol developed by CoinCo.

== See also ==
- National Automatic Merchandising Association
- European Vending Association
- European Vending Machine Manufacturers Association
- Multidrop bus
