= Link Access Procedure for Frame Relay =

- Communication protocol
- OSI layer: Data link layer
- RFCs: ITU-T Q.922 (Specification); ITU-T Q.933 (SVC Signaling)
- Hardware: FRAD, Frame Relay Switches, WAN Routers

In wide area network computing, the Link Access Procedure for Frame Relay (or LAPF) is part of the network's communications protocol which ensures that frames are error free and executed in the right sequence.

LAPF is formally defined in the International Telecommunication Union standard Q.922. It was derived from IBM's Synchronous Data Link Control protocol, which is the layer 2 protocol for IBM's Systems Network Architecture developed around 1975. ITU used SDLC as a basis to develop LAPF for the Frame Relay environment, along with other equivalents: LAPB for the X.25 protocol stack, LAPM for the V.42 protocol, and LAPD for the ISDN protocol stack.

In Frame Relay Local Management Interface (LMI) messages are carried in a variant of LAPF frames.

LAPF corresponds to the OSI model Data Link layer.

== See also ==
- Link access procedure
