= Bit-sequence independence =

Telecommunication term

In telecommunications, bit-sequence independence is a characteristic of some digital data transmission as well as digital transmission systems that impose no restrictions on, or modification of, the transmitted bit sequence.

Bit-sequence-independent protocols contrast with protocols that reserve certain bit sequences for special meanings, such as the flag sequence, 01111110, for HDLC, SDLC, and ADCCP protocols.

Bit-sequence independence allows only line codes that have the same number of transitions per bit; otherwise, the line code is dependent on the bit sequence and, therefore, bit-sequence dependent.
