= Link Access Procedure for Modems =

Error correction protocol for modems

Link Access Procedure for Modems (LAPM) is part of the V.42 error correction protocol for modems.

LAPM is an error control protocol defined in ITU-T recommendations V.42. Like many data link layer protocols, it is a variant of HDLC. Like the Microcom Networking Protocols that preceded it, LAPM uses cyclic redundancy checking (CRC) and retransmission of corrupted data (ARQ) to ensure data reliability.

Error control protocols such as LAPM use frames of variable lengths, each beginning with a header and ending with a frame check sequence trailer (a cyclic redundancy check). Correctly received packets are acknowledged, and unacknowledged packets are automatically retransmitted (ARQ).

The larger the payload included in each frame, the smaller the relative cost of transmitting the header and trailer bits. Usually LAPM adds only about 5 percent framing overhead. This is a noticeable improvement over the fixed 25% overhead of start and stop bits required by direct asynchronous serial communication, but obviously such large frames impose a cost in the form of communication latency.

LAPM has an optional selective reject (SREJ) functionality which allows it to resend only the corrupted frames, providing faster recovery from an error.

The ITU-T V.42 LAPM procedure is considered more robust than the Microcom Networking Protocols (MNP) that preceded it, and has a more sophisticated and powerful data compression option in V.42bis, allowing much greater data throughput.

ITU-T V.42bis added a string compression algorithm called BTLZ (British Telecom Lempel Ziv), in which frequently occurring strings of characters are replaced by code words. The "dictionary" of strings is dynamically maintained during transmission and keeps track of changes in the data; new strings are added and old strings are deleted. As the data may not always be compressible (for example encrypted or pre-compressed data) the modem has the ability to switch between compressed and uncompressed modes of operation. Compression performance is continually monitored and, if no compression is obtained, the modem transmits the data in uncompressed form. Even while in uncompressed mode, the modem monitors the characteristics of the data and switches compression back on as soon as some benefit can be achieved.

== See also ==
- Link access procedure
- Point-to-Point Protocol (PPP)
