= Start signal =

Signal

In telecommunications, a start signal is a signal that prepares a device to receive data or to perform a function.

In asynchronous serial communication, start signals are used at the beginning of a character that prepares the receiving device for the reception of the code elements.

A start signal is limited to one signal element usually having the duration of a unit interval.
