= Cisco HDLC =

Extension to the High-Level Data Link Control (HDLC) network protocol

Cisco HDLC (cHDLC) is an extension to the High-Level Data Link Control (HDLC) network protocol, and was created by Cisco. HDLC is a bit-oriented synchronous data link layer protocol that was originally developed by the International Organization for Standardization (ISO). Often described as being a proprietary extension, the details of cHDLC have been widely distributed and the protocol has been implemented by many network equipment vendors. cHDLC extends HDLC with multi-protocol support.

== Framing ==
Cisco HDLC frames uses an alternative framing structure to the standard ISO HDLC. To support multiple protocols encapsulation, cHDLC frames contain a field for identifying the network protocol.

== Structure ==
=== cHDLC frame structure ===
The following table describes the structure of a cHDLC frame on the wire.

Address	Control	Protocol Code	Information	Frame Check Sequence (FCS)	Flag
8 bits	8 bits	16 bits	Variable length, 0 or more bits, in multiples of 8	16 bits	8 bits

- The Address field is used to specify the type of packet contained in the cHDLC frame; 0x0F for Unicast and 0x8F for Broadcast packets.
- The Control field is always set to zero (0x00).
- The Protocol Code field is used to specify the protocol type encapsulated within the cHDLC frame (e.g. 0x0800 for Internet Protocol).

=== SLARP address request–response frame structure ===
The Serial Line Address Resolution Protocol (SLARP) frame is designated by a specific cHDLC protocol code field value of 0x8035.

Three types of SLARP frame are defined: address requests (0x00), address replies (0x01), and keep-alive frames (0x02).

The following table shows the structure of a SLARP cHDLC address request–response frame.

Address	Control	Protocol Code	SLARP Op-Code	Address	Mask	Reserved	Frame Check Sequence (FCS)	Flag
8 bits	8 bits	16 bits (0x8035)	32 bits	32 bits	32 bits	16 bits	16 bits	8 bits

- The op-code will be 0x00 for address requests and 0x01 for address responses.
- The Address and Mask fields are used to contain a four-octet IP address and mask. These are 0 for address requests.
- The two-byte Reserved field is currently unused and undefined.

=== SLARP Keep-Alive frame structure ===
The following table shows the structure of a SLARP cHDLC keep-alive frame.

Address	Control	Protocol Code	SLARP Op-Code	Sequence Number (Sender)	Sequence Number (Last Received)	Reliability	Frame Check Sequence (FCS)	Flag
8 bits	8 bits	16 bits (0x8035)	32 bits	32 bits	32 bits	16 bits	16 bits	8 bits

- The op-code is 0x02 for keep-alives.
- The sender sequence number increments with each keep-alive sent by this sender.
- The received sequence number is the last sequence number received by this sender.
- The two-byte Reliability field is required to be set to 0xFFFF.

== See also ==
- Point-to-Point Protocol, an Internet Standard defined by RFC 1661 and RFC 1662 that solves the problems Cisco HDLC solves as well as many other problems.
