= DEX (protocol) =

DEX (data exchange) is a format for collecting audit and event data from vending machines.

DEX was introduced in the late 1980s by bottlers who provided product to vending machines. It was intended to improve auditing of vending machines, simplify inventory management. DEX records cash in/out, product movement and other audit data. The format was adopted as a standard by the National Automatic Merchandising Association Technology Committee after it was already in use by bottlers. It was included in NAMA VDI version 1.0, announced in 2009.

== DEX improves route accounting ==
DEX, Direct Exchange, is a form of electronic data interchange, EDI, used by direct store delivery, DSD, distributors to electronically send their delivery information, invoices and or credit memos, to the retailer at the time of delivery. DEX has been around for many years and is used by all major grocery retailers as well as numerous smaller chains and convenience stores.

A DEX client can now run on popular mobile operating systems like Windows Mobile, Android and iOS, and allows a supplier to send Invoice detail to a retailer. At the dock physical adjustments are captured electronically. This is all facilitated using the 894 Delivery/Return Base Record and 895 Delivery/Return Acknowledgment or Adjustment transaction sets as detailed in the UCS Standards Manual, available from GS1 US, Inc.

In supporting DSD, UCS has two parts: DEX/UCS (Direct EXchange) linking the computers of supplier and retailer at the store backdoor, and NEX/UCS (Network EXchange) linking their office computers.

== See also ==
- DDCMP
