= Ebus =

Ebus, EBUS, or E-bus may refer to:

- Ebus (intercity bus), an intercity bus service in Canada owned by Pacific Western Transportation
- EBUS (serial buses), a data-bus communication interface
- Electric bus, several types of buses which uses electric power
  - Battery electric bus, the most common type of electric bus
- Endobronchial ultrasound, a diagnostic procedure used in Medicine
