= Digital Data Communications Message Protocol =

Communications protocol

Digital Data Communications Message Protocol (DDCMP) is a byte-oriented communications protocol devised by Digital Equipment Corporation in 1974 to allow communication over point-to-point network links for the company's DECnet Phase I network protocol suite. The protocol uses full or half duplex synchronous and asynchronous links and allowed errors introduced in transmission to be detected and corrected. It was retained and extended for later versions of the DECnet protocol suite. DDCMP has been described as the "most popular and pervasive of the commercial byte-count data link protocols".

== See also ==
- DEX
