= Code conversion =

Concept in telecommunications

In telecommunications, the term code conversion has the following meanings:

1. Conversion of signals, or groups of signals, in one code into corresponding signals, or groups of signals, in another code.

2. A process for converting a code of some predetermined bit structure, such as 5, 7, or 14 bits per character interval, to another code with the same or a different number of bits per character interval.

In code conversion, alphabetical order is not significant.
