= Signal transition =

Signal transition, when referring to the modulation of a carrier signal, is a change from one significant condition to another.

Examples of signal transitions are a change from one electric current, voltage, or power level to another; a change from one optical power level to another; a phase shift; or a change from one frequency or wavelength to another.

Signal transitions are used to create signals that represent information, such as "0" and "1" or "mark" and "space".

== See also ==
- Switching loss
