= Multidrop bus =

Type of computer bus

A multidrop bus (MDB) is a computer bus able to connect three or more devices. A process of arbitration determines which device sends information at any point. The other devices listen for the data they are intended to receive.

Multidrop buses have the advantage of simplicity and extensibility, but their differing electrical characteristics make them relatively unsuitable for high frequency or high bandwidth applications.

== In computing ==
Since 2000, multidrop standards such as PCI and Parallel ATA are increasingly being replaced by point-to-point systems such as PCI Express and SATA. Modern SDRAM chips exemplify the problem of electrical impedance discontinuity. Fully Buffered DIMM is an alternative approach to connecting multiple DRAM modules to a memory controller.

== In automotive ==
One of the first widespread multidrop serial buses available is CAN bus designed by engineers at BOSCH starting in 1983, released in 1986. CANbus is widely considered to be replaced by SPE in the near future.

Starting in 2019, the IEEE defined multiple multidrop-bus ethernet standards, namely in 802.3cg and 802.3da, called 10BASE-T1S, and 10BASE-T1M respectively, the latter being an improvement in terms of noise resistance, power delivery and collision avoidance. Both 10BASE-T1S and 10BASE-T1M directly compete with Can XL.

== For vending machines ==
=== MDB/ICP ===
MDB/ICP (formerly known as MDB) is a multidrop bus computer networking protocol used within the vending machine industry, currently published by the American National Automatic Merchandising Association.

=== ccTalk ===
The ccTalk multidrop bus protocol uses an 8 bit TTL-level asynchronous serial protocol. It uses address randomization to allow multiple similar devices on the bus (after randomisation the devices can be distinguished by their serial number). ccTalk was developed by CoinControls, but is used by multiple vendors.

== See also ==
- Bus network topology
- EIA-485
- 1-Wire
- Open collector
- I2C
