= Advanced Data Communication Control Procedures =

Computer networking protocol

In telecommunications, Advanced Data Communication Control Procedures (or Protocol) (ADCCP) is a bit-oriented data link layer protocol developed by the American National Standards Institute. It is functionally equivalent to the ISO High-Level Data Link Control (HDLC) protocol.

Although the ISO and ANSI standards writers coordinated their work, so the differences between the standards are mainly editorial, there is one meaningful difference: ADCCP's definition of the basic subset required to implement balanced asynchronous mode includes the RSET frame, while HDLC makes it optional.

One major difference between the two is the unnumbered (U) format. When extended (7-bit) sequence numbers are used, I and S frames have two-byte control fields. Like early versions of HDLC, ADCCP specifies a 2-byte control field format with the P/F flag duplicated. Later HDLC specifications, in particular ISO/IEC 13239, changed that to specify that U frames have 1-byte control fields in all cases.

ADCCP control fields
| First byte | | | | | | | | Second byte | | | | | | | | Description |
| 0 | 1 | 2 | 3 | 4 | 5 | 6 | 7 | 0 | 1 | 2 | 3 | 4 | 5 | 6 | 7 | Description |
|---|---|---|---|---|---|---|---|---|---|---|---|---|---|---|---|---|
| 0 | N(S) | | | P/F | N(R) | | | | | | | | | | | I frame, N(S) is a 3-bit send sequence number |
| 1 | 0 | type | | P/F | N(R) | | | | | | | | | | | S frame, N(R) is a 3-bit receive sequence number |
| 1 | 1 | type | | P/F | type | | | | | | | | | | | U frame |
| 0 | N(S) | | | | | | | P/F | N(R) | | | | | | | Extended I frame, N(S) is a 7-bit sequence number |
| 1 | 0 | type | | —0— | | | | P/F | N(R) | | | | | | | Extended S frame, N(R) is a 7-bit sequence number |
| 1 | 1 | type | | P/F | type | | | P/F | —0— | | | | | | | Extended U frame (ADCCP only) |

== See also ==
- Data link layer
- High-Level Data Link Control
- Self-synchronizing code
