= Link access procedure =

Link Access Procedure (LAP) protocols are data link layer protocols for framing and transmitting data across point-to-point links. LAP was originally derived from HDLC (High-Level Data Link Control), but was later updated and renamed LAPB (LAP Balanced).

LAPB is the data link protocol for X.25. Other related LAP protocols are:

- MLP (Multilink Procedure)
- LAPD (Link Access Prodecure D-channel)
- LAPM (Link Access Procedure for Modems)
- LAPF (Link Access Procedure for Frame Relay)
