= Protocol Builder =

Programming tool to build network connectivity components

Protocol Builder is a tool in programming languages to generate code to build protocols in a fast and reliable way. Network programming for all kinds of protocols (such as TCP, UDP, and SNMP) includes converting data to be transferred to raw bytes in the sending side and parsing these bytes in the receiving side. Protocol builders facilitate this stage, usually by automatically generating the code.

Protocol Programming has many components to be developed, these are: server listener, server connection, client connection, packets, and loggers. Most protocol builders implement these components automatically so developers save time and money.

Currently, there are two Protocol Builders in the market, one for C++ from UpRedSun which is for TCP and UDP protocols. The second one is for .Net languages which generates the code in C# for TCP Protocols, this tool is called .Net Protocol Builder.
