= Overhead (engineering) =

Extra design features

In engineering, some methods or components make special demands on the system. The extra design features necessary to meet these demands are called overhead. For instance, in electrical engineering, a particular integrated circuit might draw large current, requiring a robust power delivery circuit and a heat-dissipation mechanism.

== See also ==
- Overhead (business)
- Overhead (computing)
