= Stop signal =

Signal

In telecommunications, a stop signal is a signal that marks the end of part of a transmission, for example:

1. In asynchronous serial communication, a signal at the end of a character that prepares the receiving device for the reception of a subsequent character. A stop signal is usually limited to one signal element having any duration equal to or greater than a specified minimum value.
2. A signal to a receiving mechanism to wait for the next signal.
