= Signal element =

In signal theory, a signal element is a part of a signal that is distinguished by its:

- duration,
- magnitude,
- nature (the modulation technique used to create the element),
- relative position to other elements,
- transition from one signal state to another.

The rate at which signal elements are sent is called the symbol rate and is measured in baud.
