= Significant instant =

Instant of change of a discretely-timed signal

In telecommunications, a significant instant is the instant of change from one significant condition to another within a discretely-timed signal

A signal in which the time interval between two successive significant instants is constant is called an isochronous signal. This time interval is called the unit interval.

== See also ==
- Isochronous signal
- Synchronization in telecommunications
- Synchronous network
