= Byte-oriented protocol =

Byte-oriented framing protocol is "a communications protocol in which full bytes are used as control codes. Also known as character-oriented protocol." For example UART communication is byte-oriented.

The term "character-oriented" is deprecated, since the notion of character has changed. An ASCII character fits to one byte (octet) in terms of the amount of information. With the internationalization of computer software, wide characters became necessary, to handle texts in different languages. In particular, Unicode characters (or strictly speaking code points) can be 1, 2, 3 or 4 bytes in UTF-8, and other encodings of Unicode use two or four bytes per code point.

== See also ==
- Bit-oriented protocol
