= Symbol rate =

Rate of modulation of a digital signal

In a digitally modulated signal or a line code, symbol rate, modulation rate or baud rate is the number of symbol changes, waveform changes, or signaling events across the transmission medium per unit of time. The symbol rate is a kind of aperiodic frequency, measured in baud (Bd) or symbols per second. In the case of a line code, the symbol rate is the pulse rate in pulses per second. Each symbol can represent or convey one or several bits of data. The symbol rate is related to the gross bit rate, expressed in bits per second.

== Symbols ==
A symbol may be described as either a pulse in digital baseband transmission or a tone in passband transmission using modems. A symbol is a waveform, a state or a significant condition of the communication channel that persists, for a fixed period of time. A sending device places symbols on the channel at a fixed and known symbol rate, and the receiving device has the job of detecting the sequence of symbols in order to reconstruct the transmitted data. There may be a direct correspondence between a symbol and a small unit of data. For example, each symbol may encode one or several binary digits (bits). The data may also be represented by the transitions between symbols, or even by a sequence of many symbols.

The symbol duration time, also known as unit interval, can be directly measured as the time between transitions by looking into an eye diagram of an oscilloscope. The symbol duration time T_{s} can be calculated as:

$$T_s = {1 \over f_s}$$

where f_{s} is the symbol rate.

For example, a baud rate of 1 kBd = 1,000 Bd is synonymous with a symbol rate of 1,000 symbols per second. In the case of a modem, this corresponds to 1,000 tones per second, and in the case of a line code, this corresponds to 1,000 pulses per second. The symbol duration time is 1/1,000 second = 1 millisecond.

=== Relationship to gross bit rate ===
The term baud rate has sometimes incorrectly been used to mean bit rate, since these rates are the same in old modems as well as in the simplest digital communication links using only one bit per symbol, such that binary "0" is represented by one symbol, and binary "1" by another symbol. In more advanced modems and data transmission techniques, a symbol may have more than two states, so it may represent more than one binary digit (a binary digit always represents one of exactly two states). For this reason, the baud rate value will often be lower than the gross bit rate.

Example of use and misuse of "baud rate": It is correct to write "the baud rate of my COM port is 9,600" if one means that the bit rate is 9,600 bit/s, since there is one bit per symbol in this case. It is not correct to write "the baud rate of Ethernet is 100 megabaud" or "the baud rate of my modem is 56,000" if one means bit rate. See below for more details on these techniques.

The difference between symbol rate and bit rate can be understood by considering a person using a single semaphore flag who can move the flag to a new position once each second, so the signaling rate (baud) is one symbol per second. The flag can be held in eight distinct positions: Straight up, 45° left, 90° left, 135° left, straight down (which is the rest state, corresponding to no signal), 135° right, 90° right, and 45° right. Each signal (symbol) carries three bits of information, since it takes three binary digits to encode eight states. The data rate is three bits per second. In practice, two flags are used together, increasing the number of symbols and the data rate.

If N bits are conveyed per symbol, and the gross bit rate is R, inclusive of channel coding overhead, the symbol rate can be calculated as:

$$f_s = {R \over N}$$

In that case, M = 2^{N} different symbols are used. In a modem, these may be sine-wave tones with unique combinations of amplitude, phase and frequency. For example, in a 64QAM modem, M = 64. In a line code, these may be M different voltage levels.

By taking information per pulse N in bit/pulse to be the base-2-logarithm of the number of distinct messages M that could be sent, Hartley constructed a measure of the gross bit rate R as:

$$R = f_s \log_2(M)$$

where f_{s} is the baud rate in symbols/second or pulses/second. (See Hartley's law).

=== Modems for passband transmission ===
Modulation is used in passband filtered channels such as telephone lines, radio channels and other frequency division multiplex (FDM) channels.

In a digital modulation method provided by a modem, each symbol is typically a sine wave tone with a certain frequency, amplitude and phase. Symbol rate, or baud rate, is the number of transmitted tones per second.

One symbol can carry one or several bits of information. In voiceband modems for the telephone network, it is common for one symbol to carry up to 7 bits.

Conveying more than one bit per symbol or bit per pulse has advantages. It reduces the time required to send a given quantity of data over a limited bandwidth. A high spectral efficiency in (bit/s)/Hz can be achieved; i.e., a high bit rate in bit/s although the bandwidth in hertz may be low.

The maximum baud rate for a passband for common modulation methods such as QAM, PSK and OFDM is approximately equal to the passband bandwidth.

Voiceband modem examples:

- A V.22bis modem transmits 2400 bit/s using 1200 Bd (1200 symbol/s), where each quadrature amplitude modulation symbol carries two bits of information. The modem can generate M=2^{2}=4 different symbols. It requires a bandwidth of 1200 Hz (equal to the baud rate). The carrier frequency is 1800 Hz, meaning that the lower cutoff frequency is 1,800 − 1,200/2 = 1,200 Hz, and the upper cutoff frequency is 1,800 + 1,200/2 = 2,400 Hz.
- A V.34 modem may transmit symbols at a baud rate of 3,420 Bd, and each symbol can carry up to ten bits, resulting in a gross bit rate of 3420 × 10 = 34,200 bit/s. However, the modem is said to operate at a net bit rate of 33,800 bit/s, excluding physical layer overhead.

=== Line codes for baseband transmission ===
In case of a baseband channel such as a telegraph line, a serial cable or a Local Area Network twisted pair cable, data is transferred using line codes; i.e., pulses rather than sine-wave tones. In this case, the baud rate is synonymous to the pulse rate in pulses/second.

The maximum baud rate or pulse rate for a baseband channel is called the Nyquist rate, and is double the bandwidth (double the cut-off frequency).

The simplest digital communication links (such as individual wires on a motherboard or the RS-232 serial port/COM port) typically have a symbol rate equal to the gross bit rate.

Common communication links such as 10 Mbit/s Ethernet (10BASE-T), USB, and FireWire typically have a data bit rate slightly lower than the baud rate, due to the overhead of extra non-data symbols used for self-synchronizing code and error detection.

J. M. Emile Baudot (1845–1903) worked out a five-bit code for telegraphs which was standardized internationally and is commonly called Baudot code.

More than two voltage levels are used in advanced techniques such as FDDI and 100/1,000 Mbit/s Ethernet LANs, and others, to achieve high data rates.

1,000 Mbit/s Ethernet LAN cables use four wire pairs in full duplex (250 Mbit/s per pair in both directions simultaneously), and many bits per symbol to encode their data payloads.

=== Digital television and OFDM example ===
In digital television transmission, the symbol rate calculation is:

symbol rate in symbols per second = (Data rate in bits per second × 204) / (188 × bits per symbol)

The 204 is the number of bytes in a packet including the 16 trailing Reed–Solomon error correction bytes. The 188 is the number of data bytes (187 bytes) plus the leading packet sync byte (0x47).

The bits per symbol is the (modulation's power of 2) × (Forward Error Correction). So for example, in 64-QAM modulation 64 = 2^{6} so the bits per symbol is 6. The Forward Error Correction (FEC) is usually expressed as a fraction; i.e., 1/2, 3/4, etc. In the case of 3/4 FEC, for every 3 bits of data, you are sending out 4 bits, one of which is for error correction.

Example:

given bit rate = 18096263

Modulation type = 64-QAM
FEC = 3/4

then

$$\text{symbol rate} = \cfrac{18096263}{6\cdot\frac{3}{4}} ~ \cfrac{204}{188} = \cfrac{18096263}{6} ~ \cfrac{4}{3} ~ \cfrac{204}{188} = 4363638$$

In digital terrestrial television (DVB-T, DVB-H and similar techniques) OFDM modulation is used; i.e., multi-carrier modulation. The above symbol rate should then be divided by the number of OFDM sub-carriers in view to achieve the OFDM symbol rate. See the OFDM system comparison table for further numerical details.

=== Relationship to chip rate ===
Some communication links (such as GPS transmissions, CDMA cell phones, and other spread spectrum links) have a symbol rate much higher than the data rate (they transmit many symbols called chips per data bit). Representing one bit by a chip sequence of many symbols overcomes co-channel interference from other transmitters sharing the same frequency channel, including radio jamming, and is common in military radio and cell phones. Despite the fact that using more bandwidth to carry the same bit rate gives low channel spectral efficiency in (bit/s)/Hz, it allows many simultaneous users, which results in high system spectral efficiency in (bit/s)/Hz per unit of area.

In these systems, the symbol rate of the physically transmitted high-frequency signal rate is called chip rate, which also is the pulse rate of the equivalent base band signal. However, in spread spectrum systems, the term symbol may also be used at a higher layer and refer to one information bit, or a block of information bits that are modulated using for example conventional QAM modulation, before the CDMA spreading code is applied. Using the latter definition, the symbol rate is equal to or lower than the bit rate.

=== Relationship to bit error rate ===
The disadvantage of conveying many bits per symbol is that the receiver has to distinguish many signal levels or symbols from each other, which may be difficult and cause bit errors in case of a poor phone line that suffers from low signal-to-noise ratio. In that case, a modem or network adapter may automatically choose a slower and more robust modulation scheme or line code, using fewer bits per symbol, in view to reduce the bit error rate.

An optimal symbol set design takes into account channel bandwidth, desired information rate, noise characteristics of the channel and the receiver, and receiver and decoder complexity.

== Modulation ==
Many data transmission systems operate by the modulation of a carrier signal. For example, in frequency-shift keying (FSK), the frequency of a tone is varied among a small, fixed set of possible values. In a synchronous data transmission system, the tone can only be changed from one frequency to another at regular and well-defined intervals. The presence of one particular frequency during one of these intervals constitutes a symbol. (The concept of symbols does not apply to asynchronous data transmission systems.) In a modulated system, the term modulation rate may be used synonymously with symbol rate.

=== Binary modulation ===
If the carrier signal has only two states, then only one bit of data (i.e., a 0 or 1) can be transmitted in each symbol. The bit rate is in this case equal to the symbol rate. For example, a binary FSK system would allow the carrier to have one of two frequencies, one representing a 0 and the other a 1. A more practical scheme is differential binary phase-shift keying, in which the carrier remains at the same frequency, but can be in one of two phases. During each symbol, the phase either remains the same, encoding a 0, or jumps by 180°, encoding a 1. Again, only one bit of data (i.e., a 0 or 1) is transmitted by each symbol. This is an example of data being encoded in the transitions between symbols (the change in phase), rather than the symbols themselves (the actual phase). (The reason for this in phase-shift keying is that it is impractical to know the reference phase of the transmitter.)

=== N-ary modulation, N greater than 2 ===
By increasing the number of states that the carrier signal can take, the number of bits encoded in each symbol can be greater than one. The bit rate can then be greater than the symbol rate. For example, a differential phase-shift keying system might allow four possible jumps in phase between symbols. Then two bits could be encoded at each symbol interval, achieving a data rate of double the symbol rate. In a more complex scheme such as 16-QAM, four bits of data are transmitted in each symbol, resulting in a bit rate of four times the symbol rate.

=== Not a power of 2 ===
Although it is common to choose the number of symbols to be a power of 2 and send an integer number of bits per baud, this is not required. Line codes such as bipolar encoding and MLT-3 use three carrier states to encode one bit per baud while maintaining DC balance.

The 4B3T line code uses three 3-ary modulated bits to transmit four data bits, a rate of 1.33̅ bits per baud.

=== Data rate versus error rate ===
Modulating a carrier increases the frequency range, or bandwidth, it occupies. Transmission channels are generally limited in the bandwidth they can carry. The bandwidth depends on the symbol (modulation) rate (not directly on the bit rate). As the bit rate is the product of the symbol rate and the number of bits encoded in each symbol, it is clearly advantageous to increase the latter if the former is fixed. However, for each additional bit encoded in a symbol, the constellation of symbols (the number of states of the carrier) doubles in size. This makes the states less distinct from one another, which in turn makes it more difficult for the receiver to detect the symbol correctly in the presence of disturbances on the channel.

The history of modems is the attempt at increasing the bit rate over a fixed bandwidth (and therefore a fixed maximum symbol rate), leading to increasing bits per symbol. For example, ITU-T V.29 specifies 4 bits per symbol, at a symbol rate of 2,400 baud, giving an effective bit rate of 9,600 bits per second.

The history of spread spectrum goes in the opposite direction, leading to fewer and fewer data bits per symbol in order to spread the bandwidth. In the case of GPS, we have a data rate of 50 bit/s and a symbol rate of 1.023 Mchips/s. If each chip is considered a symbol, each symbol contains far less than one bit (50 bit/s / 1,023 ksymbols/s ≈ 0.000,05 bits/symbol).

The complete collection of M possible symbols over a particular channel is called a M-ary modulation scheme. Most modulation schemes transmit some integer number of bits per symbol b, requiring the complete collection to contain M = 2^{b} different symbols. Most popular modulation schemes can be described by showing each point on a constellation diagram, although a few modulation schemes (such as MFSK, DTMF, pulse-position modulation, spread spectrum modulation) require a different description.

== Significant condition ==
In telecommunication, concerning the modulation of a carrier, a significant condition is one of the signal's parameters chosen to represent information.

A significant condition could be an electric current (voltage, or power level), an optical power level, a phase value, or a particular frequency or wavelength. The duration of a significant condition is the time interval between successive significant instants. A change from one significant condition to another is called a signal transition. Information can be transmitted either during the given time interval, or encoded as the presence or absence of a change in the received signal.

Significant conditions are recognized by an appropriate device called a receiver, demodulator, or decoder. The decoder translates the actual signal received into its intended logical value, such as a binary digit (0 or 1), an alphabetic character, a mark, or a space. Each significant instant is determined when the appropriate device assumes a condition or state usable for performing a specific function, such as recording, processing, or gating.

== See also ==
- Data signaling rate
- List of interface bit rates
- Pulse-code modulation
