= Overhead bit =

Non-data bits used in communications transmission

In data transmission and telecommunication, overhead bits are non-data bits necessary for transmission (usually as part of headers, checksums, and such). For example, on the Internet, many data exchanges occur via HTTP. HTTP headers allow additional information to be passed between servers and clients in addition to "the data" (i.e., request or response) and thus may be considered to be overhead bits. Such bits are not counted as part of the goodput.
