= National Automatic Merchandising Association =

American trade association for vending industries

- Headquarters: Arlington, Virginia
- Services: National trade association of convenience services industry
- Key people: Christine Cochran (CEO)
- Website: https://namanow.org

The National Automatic Merchandising Association (NAMA) is the American national trade association of the convenience services industry, including vending, micro markets, office coffee service, and foodservice management. Headquartered in Arlington, Virginia, NAMA represents more than 1,000 member companies, including hundreds of small businesses.

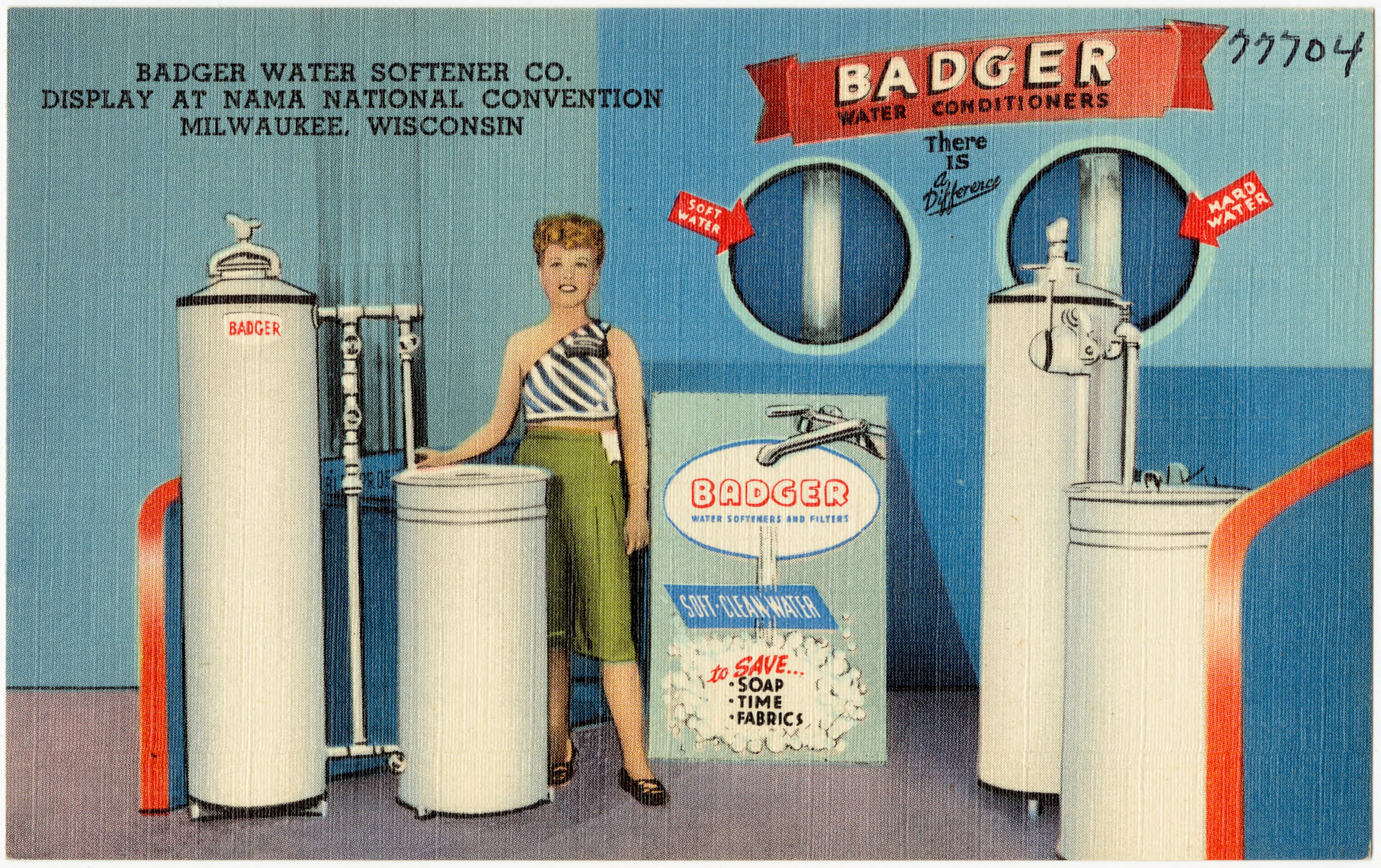
Postcard from NAMA National Convention, c. 1940s

Christine Cochran serves as the current CEO, succeeding Carla Balakgie in December 2025.

== Advocacy ==
Each year, the organization hosts an annual convention, an event for the unattended convenience industry.

In the summer, NAMA convenes an annual Fly-In, which brings more than 300 industry leaders to Washington, D.C. to discuss calorie disclosure requirements, overtime pay, and other issues affecting the convenience services industry.
