= Unit interval (data transmission) =

The unit interval (UI), also known as pulse time or symbol duration, is the shortest time between changes in a data transmission signal. In a data stream, each pulse (or symbol) takes one UI, representing the time to send a single piece of information.

When used to measure a time interval, the UI gives a relative value without units, showing the interval as a multiple of the UI. Often, but not always, the UI equals the time to send one bit (a single binary digit), known as the bit time. For example, in NRZ transmission, the UI matches the bit time, but in 2B1Q transmission, one pulse covers the time of two bits. In a system with a baud rate of 2.5 Gbit/s, the UI is 1/(2.5 Gbit/s) = 0.4 nanoseconds per symbol.

== Jitter measurement ==
Jitter, the deviation from true periodicity in signal timing, is often expressed as a fraction of the UI. For instance, jitter of 0.01 UI means the signal's timing shifts by 1% of the UI duration.

Using UI for jitter measurements allows consistent comparisons across systems with different symbol rates, as jitter often depends on the symbol duration. This works when jitter is closely linked to the timing of each symbol. This approach is common in serial communications and on-chip clock systems.

This measurement unit is extensively used in jitter literature. Examples can be found in various ITU-T Recommendations, or in the tutorial from Ransom Stephens.

== See also ==
- Baud
- Symbol rate
- Frequency
- Telecommunications
