= Serial cable =

Networking cable used for serial communication

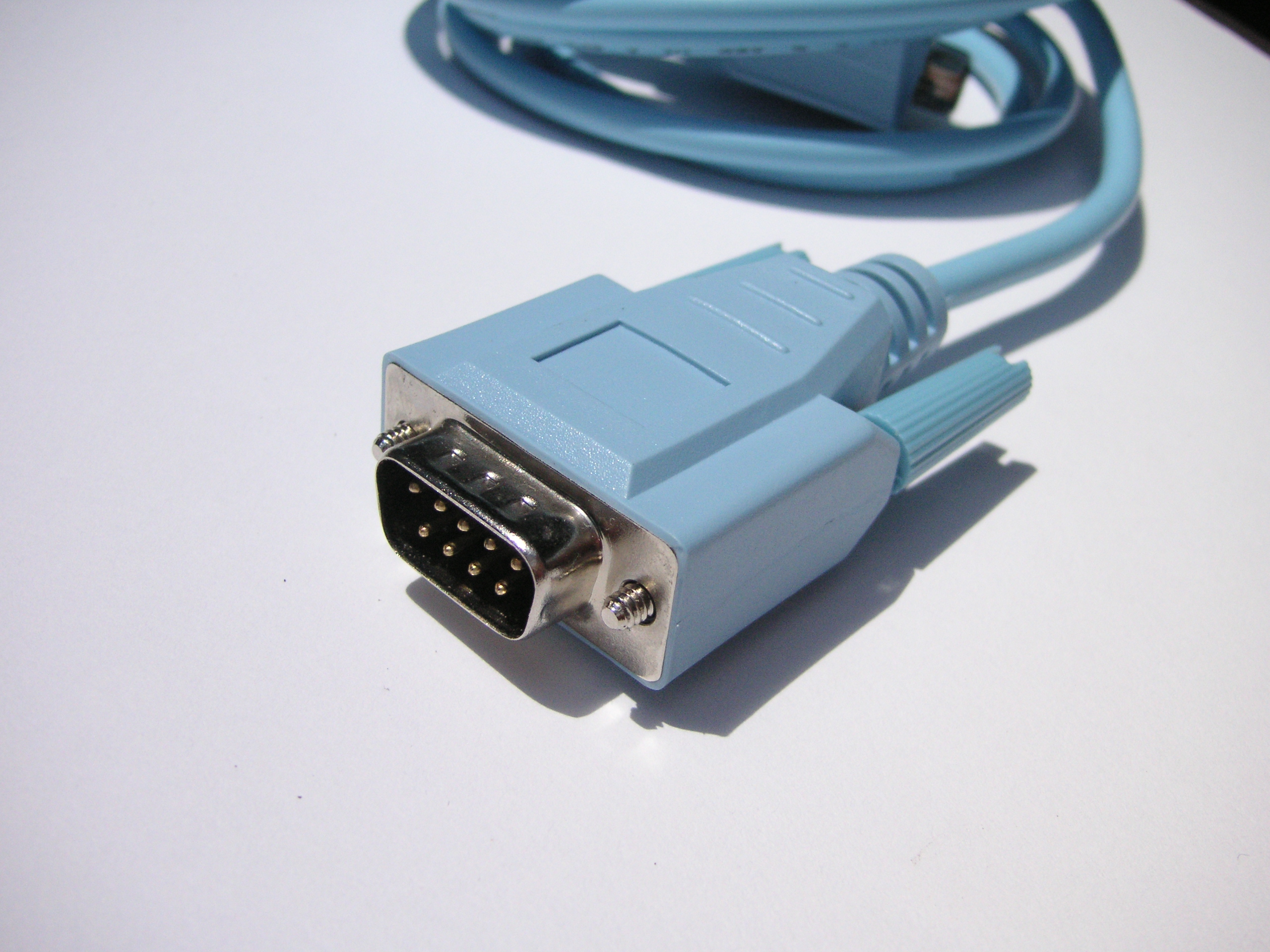
Serial cables are typically used for RS-232 communication.

A serial cable or RS-232 cable is a cable used to transfer information between two devices using a serial communication protocol. The form of connectors depends on the particular serial port used. A cable wired for connecting two DTEs directly is known as a null modem cable.

== Maximum cable lengths ==
The maximum working length of a cable varies depending on the characteristics of the transmitters and receivers, the baud rate on the cable, and the capacitance and electrical impedance of the cable. The RS-232 standard states that a compliant port must provide defined signal characteristics for a capacitive load of 2500 pF. This does not correspond to a fixed length of cable since varying cables have different characteristics. Empirically tested combinations of bit rate, serial ports, cable type, and lengths may provide reliable communications, but generally RS-232-compatible ports are intended to be connected by, at the most, a few tens of metres of cable. Other serial communications standards are better adapted to drive hundreds or thousands of metres of cable.

== See also ==
- Direct cable connection
- InterLnk
- LapLink cable (can be seen as a parallel equivalent to a serial null modem cable)
- Legacy port
- Ethernet crossover cable
- Rollover cable (also known as a “Yost” cable.)
- USB adapter
