= Windows Easy Transfer =

File transfer program by Microsoft

- Screenshot of Windows Easy Transfer
- Other names: MigWiz
- Developer: Microsoft
- Operating system: Windows XP SP2 or later
- Included with: Windows Vista through Windows 8.1
- Predecessor: Files and Settings Transfer Wizard
- Successor: Windows Backup
- Type: File transfer

Windows Easy Transfer was a specialized file-transfer program developed by Microsoft that allowed users of the Windows operating system to transfer personal files and settings from a computer running an earlier version of Windows to a computer running a newer version.

Windows Easy Transfer was introduced in Windows Vista and included in Windows 7, Windows 8, and Windows 8.1. It replaced the Files and Settings Transfer Wizard included with Windows XP and offered limited migration services for computers running Windows 2000 SP4 and Windows XP SP2. For all versions of Windows, it did not transfer applications—only files and settings.

Microsoft incorporated a key technology into the Windows Easy Transfer tool based on its acquisition of Apptimum in 2006. Apptimum's technology complemented the transfer experience offered across multiple Windows operating systems, including Windows Vista, 7, 8.1, and 10.

Windows Easy Transfer was discontinued with Windows 10. From September 1, 2015 to August 31, 2016, Microsoft partnered with Laplink to provide a free download of PCmover Express, which allowed 500 MB of data and settings to be transferred from at least Windows XP to either Windows 8.1 or Windows 10.

In September 2023, Microsoft reintroduced a feature similar to Windows Easy Transfer to the Windows 11 and Windows 10 out-of-box experience (OOBE), forming part of Windows Backup.

== History ==
For Windows 2000, Microsoft developed the User State Migration Tool command line utility that allowed users of Windows 95, 98, and NT 4.0 to migrate their data and settings to the newer operating system; it did not provide a graphical user interface. An additional migration tool, Files and Settings Transfer Wizard (migwiz.exe) was developed for Windows XP to facilitate the migration of data and settings from Windows 98 and Windows Me. It could be launched from the Windows XP CD-ROM and presented options to transfer data and settings via a 3.5-inch floppy, computer network, direct cable connection, or a Zip disk. Users could also create a wizard disk to initiate the migration process when run from earlier operating system.

A preliminary version of Windows Easy Transfer was demonstrated at the 2004 Windows Hardware Engineering Conference by Jim Allchin as the successor to the Files and Settings Transfer Wizard, scheduled for release in the next client version of Windows, Windows Vista (then codenamed "Longhorn"). As with the final release, this preliminary version could use an optional specialized USB cable to transfer data between computers.

After the release to manufacturing of Windows 7, Microsoft backported the version of Windows Easy Transfer in that operating system to Windows XP and Windows Vista as an optional download to facilitate migration to the new operating system.

== Items transferred ==
Windows Easy Transfer could transfer:

- Data files and folders

For transferring from Windows versions later than Windows 2000:

- User accounts and their settings
- Windows and application configuration data stored in files or in the Windows Registry

As of Windows 8.1, Easy Transfer can no longer export data to another computer, but can still import data from an earlier version of Windows. Microsoft has since recommended OneDrive cloud storage as a substitute.

Windows Easy Transfer did not support transferring installed applications. Microsoft planned to release a supplementary Windows Easy Transfer Companion for transferring certain supported applications from Windows XP to Windows Vista, but it remained as a perpetual beta during development and a final version was never released.

== Transfer methods ==
Several transfer methods could be used:

- An Easy Transfer Cable (not supported on Windows 8.1)
- A computer network
- A CD recorder or DVD recorder and sufficient number of CDs or DVDs
- A USB flash drive or an external hard disk drive. In this mode Windows Easy Transfer saves archive files of files and settings on the source machine to a user-specified location, which did not need to be a USB drive; the destination machine was then given access to the archives.

=== Restrictions ===
Windows Easy Transfer did not support migration from a 64-bit to a 32-bit system. Windows Vista and later versions did not support incoming connections over IrDA, serial, or parallel ports, but incoming connections over Ethernet, HPNA, and wireless LAN were supported.

In Windows 8.1, Windows Easy Transfer could only import settings from Windows 7, 8, and RT, but not from Windows Vista or from another Windows 8.1 computer. The only transfer method supported in Windows 8.1 is by a USB flash drive; transfers by an Easy Transfer Cable or a network connection are not supported.

== See also ==
- Management features new to Windows Vista
