= Thomas U. Koll =

German executive (born 1956)

- Born: October 11, 1956 (age 69); Eckernförde, Germany
- Education: Bachelor’s and Master's degrees in Political Science from the Free University of Berlin
- Occupations: Software technology executive, chairman and CEO of Laplink Software
- Spouse: Meredith Adami
- Children: 2

Thomas Koll (born October 11, 1956) is a technology business executive and chairman and CEO of Laplink Software, a provider of PC migration software based in Bellevue, Washington. Before joining Laplink in 2003, Koll was chairman and CEO of Infowave Software and vice president of Microsoft's Network Solutions Group. Koll is also an author and publisher.

== Education ==
Koll attended the Free University of Berlin where he received B.A. and M.A. degrees in political science. He was a lecturer and assistant professor of international politics at the university's Otto-Suhr Institute for five years.

== Career ==
=== Academia and publishing ===
In the Department of Political Science at the Otto-Suhr-Institute, Koll was the administrator for the Center for International Services (Spezialisierungsschwerpunkt Internationale Dienste), which coordinated the studies and programs for international careers in diplomacy and service in international organizations. As part of that, he was the lead on the introduction of the ERASMUS program and created exchange programs with the London School of Economics and the University of Sussex.

During his studies, Koll joined the Wissenschaftlicher Autoren-Verlag as co-owner and Associate Publisher (1979–84) where he published 21 books on political and history subjects. Among them was Bernd Schimmer's “Recht ohne Gerechtigkeit” (“Law Without Justice”), which described the work of the special courts during the Nazi-Regime violating human rights and furthering the Nazis' racist agenda. After departing WAV, Koll founded his own company (1984–88) specializing on city literature and architectural history. The company published four books.

During his time at the university Koll also published four books as co-author or editor. Highlight was the 1988 collection of original articles on the World Bank: Die Weltbank: Structur, Aufgaben und Bedeutung.

=== Software industry ===
Koll joined Microsoft Germany in 1988 and went on to have a 13-year tenure at the Redmond, Washington-based software giant. While at Microsoft Germany, Koll held a variety of sales and marketing positions, including acting country manager. In June 1997, Koll transferred to Microsoft headquarters in Redmond, Washington, where he was general manager of worldwide business strategy and chief of staff for Microsoft CVP and later President and CEO Steve Ballmer. In 1998, he was promoted to vice president – Network Solutions Group where he was responsible for the company's worldwide business with telecommunications firms, network equipment providers and internet service providers. Koll was instrumental in developing Microsoft's vision for the telecommunications industry and developing strategic partnerships. He predicted in 2000 that “delivery of applications over the internet may be the majority of Microsoft’s software revenue.”

Koll left Microsoft in 2001 to become CEO of Burnaby, B.C.-based Infowave Software, a developer of software for connecting business applications to wireless devices. He stepped down as CEO in 2002, but remained chairman.

In 2003, Koll purchased a controlling interest in Laplink Software and became chairman and CEO. He moved the firm from Bothell, Washington, to Kirkland, Washington. Under his leadership the company released several new products and expanded its focus into new areas including peer-to-peer file sharing.
