= List of video transcoding software =

The following is a list of video transcoding software.

== Open-source ==
- Shutter Encoder (Windows, OS X, Linux)
- DVD Flick (Windows)
- FFmpeg (Windows, OS X, Linux)
- HandBrake (Windows, OS X, Linux)
- Ingex (Linux)
- MEncoder (Windows, OS X, Linux)
- Nandub (Windows)
- Thoggen (Linux)
- VirtualDub (Windows)
- VLC Media Player (Windows, Mac OS X, Linux)
- Arista (Linux)
- Avidemux (Windows, OS X, Linux)

== Freeware ==
- Freemake Video Converter (Windows)
- FormatFactory (Windows)
- Ingest Machine DV (Windows)
- MediaCoder (Windows)
- SUPER (Windows)
- Windows Media Encoder (Windows)
- Zamzar (Web application)
- ZConvert (Windows)

== Commercial ==
- Compressor (Mac OS X)
- Colorfront Transkoder (Mac OS X, Windows)
- MPEG Video Wizard DVD (Windows)
- ProCoder (Windows)
- QuickTime Pro (Mac OS X, Windows)
- Roxio Creator (Windows)
- Sorenson Squeeze
- Telestream Episode (Mac OS X, Windows)
- TMPGEnc (Windows)
- Wowza Streaming Engine with included Wowza Transcoder feature (Linux, Mac OS X, Windows)
- Zamzar - Premium service (Web application)
- Zencoder (Web application)
- Setrix Transcoder by Setplex (Windows, Mac, Linux)

== See also ==
- Photo slideshow software
- List of video editing software
