= Brooklyn Bridge (disambiguation) =

Brooklyn Bridge is a bridge connecting Manhattan and Brooklyn, New York.

Brooklyn Bridge may also refer to:

== Transport ==
- Brooklyn Bridge, New South Wales, a bridge in New South Wales, Australia
- Brooklyn Bridge, a bridge on the Federation Trail to Brooklyn, Victoria, Australia
- Brooklyn Bridge–City Hall (IRT Lexington Avenue Line), a subway station next to Brooklyn Bridge in Manhattan, New York, U.S.

== Other uses ==
- Brooklyn Bridge (film), a 1981 Ken Burns documentary
- Brooklyn Bridge (TV series), an American television series
- Brooklyn Bridge (album), 1968 album by The Brooklyn Bridge
- Brooklyn Bridge, a novel by Karen Hesse
- Brooklyn Bridge (software), a file transfer / data transfer program
- The Brooklyn Bridge (band), a pop band
- "Brooklyn Bridge", a song by Anaïs Mitchell from Anaïs Mitchell, 2022
- "Brooklyn Bridges", nickname given to American professional basketball player Mikal Bridges upon being traded to the NBA's Brooklyn Nets in 2023

== See also ==
- Brooklyn Bridge Park, a park in Brooklyn, New York, near the Brooklyn Bridge
