= Interlnk =

DOS file sharing utility

Interlnk / FileLink
- Microsoft Interlnk Server running on MS-DOS
- Developer: Sewell Development Corporation (Interlnk)
- Release: May 1990; 36 years ago (FileLink); September 1992; 33 years ago (Interlnk)
- Operating system: DR DOS, MS-DOS, PC DOS
- License: Proprietary commercial software

Interlnk or FileLink is a networking utility for MS-DOS and compatible operating systems for sharing disks and files between two interconnected computers using the serial port or parallel port.

== On DR-DOS ==
This utility first appeared on Digital Research's DR-DOS 5.0 in 1990 as FileLink. The file transfer is only possible through the serial port and using a null modem serial cable. The computer that the commands are typed on is the slave while the other computer it is connected to is the master. The transfer speed can be chosen to be between 110 and 115,200 baud. In addition, it allows the computer to view the files stored on the other computer.

== On PC DOS and MS-DOS ==
A similar utility named Interlnk appeared on IBM's PC DOS 5.02 released in 1992 and then Microsoft's MS-DOS 6.0. It consists of two components: the INTERLNK.EXE client device driver and the INTERSVR.EXE server program. When connected, the drives on the server computer (including hard disks and floppy disk drives) are redirected and appear as additional drives on the client computer. For example, drive letters A, B and C on the server would equal to assigned letters E, F and G on the client. The letters are assigned after the last assigned drive letter on the client, which in this example would be D. In addition, the Interlnk program allows a client computer to run programs from the server computer.

Interlnk is used using a null modem serial cable, 3-wire serial cable, or bidirectional parallel cable, as well as cables provided by LapLink, FastLynx and Brooklyn Bridge commercial software. One of the computers may run version 3.0 or above of MS-DOS. Before usage, the INTERLNK.EXE driver should first be installed on the client by editing CONFIG.SYS and adding a DEVICE command specifying the location of the driver. The interlnk command shows the current status of the program. The intersvr command on the second computer is inputted to start the server. It is a full-screen text user interface program displaying the connection status (including baud rate) and the mapped drives, but does not necessarily require interaction.

Interlnk was originally developed by Sewell Development Corporation, the makers of FastLynx, and licensed by Microsoft and IBM.

== Compatibility with other platforms ==
On PC DOS 7, intersvr command is used for a serial connection while intersvr /lp1 is inputted for parallel connection. Interlnk can also be used through a Virtual DOS machine on OS/2 2.1 or greater as a client only to a DOS server when using a PC DOS image.

Interlnk also works on a Windows 95 computer in real mode MS-DOS. However Interlnk does not communicate with the Windows 95 direct cable connection (DCC) utility. FreeDOS also works with Interlnk.

== See also ==
- List of DOS commands
- Direct Cable Connection
- LapLink
