= Parallel Line Internet Protocol =

The Parallel Line Internet Protocol (PLIP) is a computer networking protocol for direct computer-to-computer communications using the parallel port, normally used for connections to a printer.

PLIP provides link layer services for the Internet Protocol, which is used for forming small local area networks and large computer networks, such as the Internet. This enables computers without standard dedicated networking hardware, such as Ethernet, but with older parallel port devices, to communicate.

== Operation ==
The Internet Protocol Suite is the standards-based networking model and software specification for forming small and large computer networks, from local area networks to global communication systems like the Internet. It is usually implemented by software and hardware features that use Ethernet network interface cards, cabling, and networking switches or hubs.

Early personal computers did not have Ethernet hardware in their design, and bus adapters were initially expensive. A solution was to use, at the time, a standard parallel port, typically used for connection to a printer or similar output device. The ports on two computers are connected with a so-called null-printer cable, sometimes called a LapLink cable.

The LapLink cable connects five output pins of a parallel port to five input pins on the opposing port for each direction. Due to the lack of internal timing in the parallel ports, synchronization is implemented via software handshaking: four pins are used for data transfer and one is used for synchronization. The logical values at these pins are read and written directly by the software via an input or output instruction.

This method does not connect the bidirectional data lines of the two devices to prevent both lines from being active at the same time. The status lines ERROR, SLCT, PAPOUT, ACK, and BUSY on one device are connected to data pins d0 through d4, respectively, on the other.

A byte is transmitted by dividing it into two nibbles of four bits each. Each nibble is transmitted by setting the four data lines according to the four nibble bits and then toggling the acknowledge line. This toggle indicates to the receiving host that the nibble is ready to be read. Once the receiving host has read the nibble, it toggles its synchronization line to tell the transmitter that the nibble has been read and that a new one may be sent. Both hosts use a toggle on their acknowledge lines to indicate that the read or write operation has been performed. As a result, each host has to wait for a toggle from the other host before proceeding with a new operation.

As an example, the transfer of nibble 0010 proceeds as follows:

 t->r lines       r->s lines      operation
 
 00010            0xxxx           transmitter sets data lines to 0010
 10010            0xxxx           transmitter toggle ACK line
                                  receiver detects toggle and reads 0010
 10010            1xxxx           receiver toggle ACK line
                                  transmitter detects toggle

This procedure is repeated for the next nibble when the transmitter detects the toggle.

Internet Protocol packets are sent over the line after being encapsulated into PLIP packets before being transmitted over the line. The encapsulated packet has the following structure:

- packet length: 2 bytes, little endian
- ethernet header (mostly used for backward compatibility)
- the IP packet
- checksum: 1 byte, sum modulo 256 bytes in the packet

The length and checksum are calculated over the second and third fields only so that the actual total length of the packet is three more than the length reported in the first two bytes of the packet.

== Similar methods ==
An analogous feature for serial communications ports is the Serial Line Internet Protocol (SLIP), using null-modem cables but allows the transfer of four bits at a time rather than one. It generally works at higher bitrates. The method is based on the "Crynwr" standard devised by Russ Nelson.

Ethernet may also be used as a direct computer-to-computer communications method using an Ethernet crossover cable.

Other point-to-point connections, such as USB host-to-host bridges or cables, are also used to transfer files between two computers where a network is not necessary or available.

== See also ==
- PPP Point-to-Point Protocol
- Direct cable connection
- Serial Line Internet Protocol (SLIP)
