= Direct cable connection =

Feature of Microsoft Windows

A Direct Cable Connection dialog box on Windows 95

Direct Cable Connection (DCC) is a feature of Microsoft Windows that allows a computer to transfer and share files (or connected printers) with another computer, via a connection using either the serial port, parallel port or the infrared port of each computer. It is well suited to computers that do not have an Ethernet adapter installed, although DCC in Windows XP can be configured to use one (with a proper crossover cable if no Ethernet hub is used) if available.

The software is available in Windows 9x, Windows 2000 and Windows XP; communication is also possible with Windows NT 4.0 although not under the DCC name. Windows Vista drops support for the Direct Cable Connection feature as Ethernet, Wi-Fi and Bluetooth have become ubiquitous on newer generation computers. To transfer files and settings, Windows Vista includes Windows Easy Transfer, which uses a proprietary USB-to-USB bridge cable known as the Easy Transfer Cable.

== Connection types ==
If using the serial ports of the computer, a null modem cable (or a null modem adapter connected to a standard serial cable) must be used to connect each of the two computers to communicate properly. Such connection uses PPP protocol.

If the parallel ports are used, Windows supports standard or basic 4-bit cable (commonly known as LapLink cable), Enhanced Capabilities Port (ECP) cable, or Universal Cable Module (UCM) cable (which was known as DirectParallel cable by Parallel Technologies).

Infrared communication ports, like the ones found on laptop computers (such as IrDA), can also be used.

=== USB ===
Connecting any two computers using USB requires a special proprietary bridge cable. A directly connected pin-to-pin USB type A cable does not work, as USB does not support such a type of communication. In fact, attempting to do so may even damage the connecting computers, as it will effectively short the two computers' power supplies together by connecting their 5V and GND lines. This can possibly destroy one or both machines and cause a fire hazard since the two machines may not have exactly the same USB source voltage. Therefore, Direct Cable Connection over USB is not possible; a USB link cable must be used, as seen in the Microsoft knowledge base article 814982. However, with a USB link cable, a program which supports data transfer using that cable must be used. Typically, such a program is supplied with the USB link cable. The DCC wizard or Windows Explorer cannot be used to transfer files over a USB link cable.

==== Newer hardware technology with identical functionality ====
There are at least 2 known USB-crossover cables capable of bidirectional data-transfer between computers similar to RJ45/Ethernet cables: ProlificUSA.com's TE-C0372 High Speed USB 2.0 Host to Host Bridge Cable (PL25A1 Chipset) and ProlificUSA.com's TE-C0363 Superspeed USB 3.0 Host to Host Bridge Cable (PL27A1 Chipset), and drivers for these seem to have been included in newer versions of the Linux kernel.

== See also ==
- Interlnk (on DOS)
- Null modem
- LapLink cable
- Serial line internet protocol (SLIP)
- Parallel line internet protocol (PLIP)
- Point-to-Point Protocol (PPP)
- OBject EXchange (OBEX protocol often used via Bluetooth or via USB-cables)
- Android Debug Bridge (adb)
