= Serial Line Internet Protocol =

Internet Protocol encapsulation for serial ports and router connections

The Serial Line Internet Protocol (SLIP) is an encapsulation of the Internet Protocol (Note: SLIP does not actually care about the internal structures of IP: any network layer protocols can be sent over the wire.) designed to work over serial ports and router connections. It is documented in RFC 1055. On personal computers, SLIP has largely been replaced by the Point-to-Point Protocol (PPP), which is better engineered, has more features, and does not require its IP address configuration to be set before it is established. On microcontrollers, however, SLIP is still the preferred way of encapsulating IP packets, due to its very small overhead.

Some people refer to the successful and widely used RFC 1055 Serial Line Internet Protocol as "Rick Adams' SLIP", to avoid confusion with other proposed protocols named "SLIP". Those other protocols include the much more complicated RFC 914 appendix D Serial Line Interface Protocol.

== Description ==
Hex value	Dec Value	Oct Value	Abbreviation	Description
0xC0	192	300	END	Frame End
0xDB	219	333	ESC	Frame Escape
0xDC	220	334	ESC_END	Transposed Frame End
0xDD	221	335	ESC_ESC	Transposed Frame Escape

SLIP modifies a standard TCP/IP datagram by:

- appending a special "END" byte to it, which distinguishes datagram boundaries in the byte stream,
- if the END byte occurs in the data to be sent, the two byte sequence ESC, ESC_END is sent instead,
- if the ESC byte occurs in the data, the two byte sequence ESC, ESC_ESC is sent.
- variants of the protocol may begin, as well as end, packets with END.

SLIP requires a serial port configuration of 8 data bits, no parity, and either EIA hardware flow control, or CLOCAL mode (3-wire null-modem) UART operation settings.

SLIP does not provide error detection, being reliant on upper layer protocols for this. Therefore, SLIP on its own is not satisfactory over a link which is error-prone, such as a poor quality dial-up connection.

SLIP escape characters were also required on some modem connections to escape Hayes command set, allowing therefore to pass binary data through those modems that would recognize some characters as commands.

== CSLIP ==
A version of SLIP with header compression is called Compressed SLIP (CSLIP). The compression algorithm used in CSLIP is known as Van Jacobson TCP/IP Header Compression. CSLIP has no effect on the data payload of a packet and is independent of any compression by the serial line modem used for transmission. It reduces the Transmission Control Protocol (TCP) header from twenty bytes to seven bytes. CSLIP has no effect on User Datagram Protocol (UDP) datagrams.

== History ==
RFC 1055, a "non-standard" for SLIP, traces its origins to the 3COM UNET TCP/IP implementation from the 1980s. Rick Adams added SLIP to the popular 4.2BSD in 1984 and it "quickly caught on". By the time of the RFC (1988), it is described as "commonly used on dedicated serial links and sometimes for dialup purposes".

The last version of FreeBSD to include "slattach" (a command for connecting to slip) in the manual database is FreeBSD 7.4, released 2011. The manual claims that auto-negotiation exists for CSLIP. The FreeBSD version is inherited from 4.3BSD.

Linux formerly used the same code base for SLIP and KISS (TNC). The split occurred before the start of kernel git history (Linux-2.6.12-rc2, 2005). The SLIP driver offers a special "6-bit" escaped mode to accommodate modems incapable of handling non-ASCII characters. The Linux slattach command (written independently) also has the ability to auto-detect CSLIP support.

== See also ==
- Parallel Line Internet Protocol
- Slirp
- KA9Q
- Direct cable connection
- In-band signaling
- KISS (amateur radio protocol)
- Consistent Overhead Byte Stuffing
