= Van Jacobson TCP/IP Header Compression =

Van Jacobson TCP/IP Header Compression is a data compression protocol described in RFC 1144, specifically designed by Van Jacobson to improve TCP/IP performance over slow serial links. Van Jacobson compression reduces the normal 40 byte TCP/IP packet headers down to 3–4 bytes for the average case; it does this by saving the state of TCP connections at both ends of a link, and only sending the differences in the header fields that change. This makes a very big difference for interactive performance on low speed links, although it will not do anything about the processing delay inherent to most dial-up modems.

Van Jacobson Header Compression (also VJ compression, or just Header Compression) is an option in most versions of PPP. Versions of Serial Line Internet Protocol (SLIP) with VJ compression are often called CSLIP (Compressed SLIP).
