= Laplink PCmover =

Laplink PCmover is a PC migration software developed by Laplink Software. Introduced in 2005, as the successor to Laplink, PCmover comes in a variety of versions that provide the ability to move or restore all selected files, folders, settings, user profiles and programs from an old PC to a new one, an old operating system to a new one, or an old hard drive to a new one. Microsoft has partnered with Laplink on multiple occasions and recommends PCmover for automatically moving programs, files and profile setting to new Windows 10 PCs. Please note that several of the versions below do not provide the ability to transfer programs or user configurations. Most of the PCmover products have limits on the number of computers that can have their contents transferred.

== Versions ==
=== PCmover Enterprise ===
PCmover Enterprise transfers installed applications, settings, data and user accounts. PCmover Enterprise automates the migration process for in-place upgrades, PC refreshes and break-fix recovery scenarios. Enterprise can utilize policy files for controlling company-wide migrations. The product has been used by large enterprises to support over 100,000 migrations, for example, from Windows 7 to Windows 10.

=== PCmover Professional ===
PCmover Professional provides migration tools covering both old and new Windows operating systems and migration scenarios. It offers a user interface that walks users through the migration process. Old files, folders and settings from the source are integrated directly with the new target system.

=== PCmover Profile Migrator (PPM) ===
PCmover Profile Migrator (PPM) migrates applications, files and settings between user profiles on the same computer. This tool automates the process of transitioning users from Local Active Directory to Azure Active Directory.

=== PCmover Home ===
PCmover Home was released in May 2009. It allows users to migrate all of their files, personalized settings and applications from an old PC to a new PC. PCmover Home has several limitations: the old PC cannot have more than one drive or partition, it only moves the logged on user, it does not support in-place upgrades, and it cannot restore an old PC image.

=== PCmover Express ===
PCmover Express automatically transfers old Windows files, user and personalized setting from an older Windows PC to a new Windows 10 PC. One limitation is that it does not move applications. Microsoft made PCmover Express free to users in 2015 for one year to encourage users to upgrade to the latest versions of its operating systems.

=== PCmover Image & Drive Assistant ===
PCmover Image & Drive Assistant allows a user to create an image of an existing hard drive and restore that image to a new PC. It can be used to restore an image of an old Windows PC or hard drive to a new PC that has a different Windows operating system complete with all files, settings and programs without overwriting anything on the new PC, including the operating system.

=== PCmover Windows Store Edition ===
This edition of PCmover provides support for Windows 10 S for users who want to migrate to or from a computer operating in this mode. The software can be downloaded from the Windows Store free of charge but is limited to transferring 500 MB of data.

=== PCmover Express for Windows XP ===
In March 2014, Laplink partnered with Microsoft to offer Windows XP users a free data migration tool to move from a Windows XP computer to a Windows 7, 8 or 8.1 computer due to Microsoft's deprecation of Windows Easy Transfer. PCmover Express for Windows XP will transfer files, settings and user profiles, but will not transfer applications.

=== PCmover Windows 7 Upgrade Assistant ===
PCmover Windows 7 Upgrade Assistant was released in October 2009. It allows a user to perform an in-place upgrade from Windows XP or Vista to Windows 7. PCmover Windows 7 Upgrade Assistant will automatically restore any selected files, personalized settings and applications from the old Windows operating system to Windows 7 without overwriting the new operating system. All compatible applications are also installed.

=== PCmover Windows 8 Upgrade Assistant ===
PCmover Windows 8 Upgrade Assistant was released in January 2012. It allows a user to perform an in-place upgrade from Windows XP, Vista or 7 to Windows 7 or 8. PCmover Windows 8 Upgrade Assistant will automatically restore any selected files, personalized settings and applications from the old Windows operating system to Windows 8 without overwriting the new operating system. All compatible applications are also installed.

== Reception ==
Laplink's PCmover software was reviewed positively by Tech Radar Pro. PC World also reviewed it positively, but noted that it does not handle complex migrations gracefully and has unclear instructions. Barron's gave PCmover Professional 5 stars. Windows Report called PCmover the best tool for moving from Windows 7 to Windows 10.
