= Windows Backup (2023) =

Backup component of Windows 10 and Windows 11

- Windows Backup on Windows 10
- Developer: Microsoft
- Initial release: September 26, 2023; 2 years ago
- Included with: Windows 11 (as of build 22621.2361); Windows 10 (as of build 19044.3448 and 19045.3448)
- Predecessor: Backup and Restore; Windows Easy Transfer
- Type: Backup software

Windows Backup is a backup component released for Windows 11 and Windows 10. It allows a user to continuously back up files and settings from their device to OneDrive cloud backup, and to directly transfer files and settings to a new computer.

The Windows Backup application is used to begin synchronizing the computer with OneDrive, and to monitor the status of the backup. The Documents, Desktop, Pictures, Music, and Videos personal folders are moved into OneDrive, and settings including installed applications, desktop personalization, and passwords are regularly backed up.

Windows Backup acts as a replacement for Windows Easy Transfer, which provided a wizard to transfer data from an old computer to a new computer. When setting up a new Windows device, files and settings can be restored as part of the out-of-box experience (OOBE) wizard. The data can be restored from OneDrive, or by using a direct network connection to the old computer.

== History ==
Windows Backup originally appeared on May 24, 2023 as a built-in application in a Windows Insider release of Windows 11, build 23466. It released to the public on September 26, 2023 with the "Moment 4" update to Windows 11, version 22H2, and Windows 10, version 21H2 and 22H2 in a cumulative update. Along with the Windows Insider build, Microsoft released guidance for developers to ensure their applications and corresponding settings are migrated when users move between systems.

The app was initially restricted to devices running Home or Pro editions that are signed into a personal Microsoft Account. Devices running an Enterprise edition, or joined to a domain, are restricted from using Windows Backup. On March 1, 2024, following criticism, the "Moment 5" update hid the Windows Backup app from appearing in the Start menu on ineligible devices.

In August 2025, Microsoft released Windows Backup for Organizations. The feature is opted into through mobile device management (MDM) solutions such as Microsoft Intune. In February 2026, Microsoft released an update to Windows Backup for Organizations, allowing the ability for users to be able to initiate a restore during first sign in.

== Criticism ==
As the application necessarily requires system-level access to ensure a complete backup, it appears in the Start menu with a "System" label, and can not be uninstalled or hidden, except by fully disabling use of Microsoft Accounts through Group Policy.

Upon release, Windows Backup was automatically installed on all devices running a compatible version of Windows 11 or Windows 10, including on enterprise devices that are not eligible to use the application. Enterprise users opening the new app found in the Start menu received an error message that "This feature is not supported by your organization." It was also criticized for being installed on Windows 10 LTSC editions, where backup to OneDrive is unlikely to be useful, and because users may unknowingly violate information privacy law such as the General Data Protection Regulation. A March 2024 update to Windows 11 and Windows 10 hides access to the app if the user is not eligible to use it.

Windows 10 prompting the user to enable Windows Backup while the user is logging on

On eligible systems, Windows regularly promotes Windows Backup in some areas of the user interface. This approach has been criticized as nagware, with a goal of having the user purchase an upgraded OneDrive subscription.

- When logging onto a system following a Windows Update, the user may receive a full-screen interstitial warning about the device not being backed up. To continue to the desktop, the user must select to opt in or out of using Windows Backup.
- The user may receive notifications as they use their computer, warning that the device is not backed up. These alerts can be disabled from the context menu of the notification.
- The initial Home section of the Settings app may prompt the user to sign into their Microsoft account to back up their device, using a yellow banner that may be interpreted as a critical system issue. A similar message may also appear in the Start menu. The banners may reappear at a later date.

Brien Posey of Redmondmag.com criticized the full-screen interstitial for disrupting a Windows 11 computer that was running a server program on his home network. Paul Thurrott criticized the backup feature being enabled automatically, despite previously declining the feature.

== See also ==
- OneDrive
- Windows Easy Transfer
