= Laplink =

File transfer software

LapLink for Windows screenshot

Laplink (sometimes styled LapLink) is a proprietary software package that was developed by Mark Eppley and sold by Traveling Software. First available in 1983, LapLink was used to synchronize, copy, or move, files between two PCs, in an era before local area networks, using a parallel port and a LapLink cable, a serial port and a null modem cable, or USB and a USB ad hoc network cable. Traveling Software is now known as LapLink Software, Inc., and their main product is now the PCmover.

== Cable ==
LapLink typically shipped with a specialized cable, allowing two PCs to be linked together via a parallel port; it can be seen as the parallel equivalent of a null modem cable. This so-called LapLink cable or null-parallel cable is capable of faster transfer rates than the traditional null modem cable. At the time, almost all PCs had a parallel printer port, but neither USB nor modern Ethernet were available.

The Interlnk program on MS-DOS can also use a LapLink cable.

With the demise of parallel ports on PCs, LapLink no longer sells the traditional cable.

=== Wiring ===
The cable used two DB25 male connectors, and was wired as follows:

D0	2	15	Error
D1	3	13	Select
D2	4	12	Paper Out
D3	5	10	ACK
D4	6	11	Busy
ACK	10	5	D3
Busy	11	6	D4
Paper Out	12	4	D2
Select	13	3	D1
Error	15	2	D0
Select In	17	19	GND
GND	18	18	GND
GND	19	17	Select In
GND	21	21	GND
GND	22	22	GND
GND	23	23	GND
GND	25	25	GND

== See also ==
- Direct cable connection
- Ethernet cable
- Parallel Line Internet Protocol (PLIP)
