= PC migration =

Data transfer process

PC migration is the process of transferring the entire user environment (i.e. personal documents and settings) between two computer systems.

The migration problem is often associated with the concept of total cost of ownership where the requirement to migrate information is considered a "cost" in purchasing a new PC, similar considerations exist for businesses upgrading hardware/software.

PC migration is required whenever one needs to move to a new computer (i.e. purchasing new hardware), or upgrade to a new OS. Because of intrinsic differences and strong OS-hardware coupling, PC migration is considered to be a problem for both consumers and enterprises.

Some PC migration software products are capable of transferring not just settings and data, but also applications.

Sources for software that automates PC migration software include Laplink, Tranxition, and Swimage.

Windows 10 does not longer include a Windows transfer utility with the OS. Microsoft and Laplink PCmover have joined up to provide this functionality from Microsoft's site.
