= ZConvert =

zConvert
- Developer(s): Zuvium
- Stable release: 1.0.1 / April 9, 2010
- Operating system: Microsoft Windows
- Platform: x86
- Available in: English
- Type: Front-end
- License: Freeware
- Website: http://www.zuvium.com/convert/

zConvert is a closed-source freeware frontend for ffmpeg / libavcodec. It allows the user to convert between audio and video file formats.

== Features ==
zConvert features a custom preset system so that regular options can be stored and quickly used again, as well as built in device support for iPod Video, iPhone and PlayStation 3.
