= Zamzar =

File conversion website

Zamzar Ltd
- The logo of Zamzar
- Website type: Online file conversion
- Available in: English
- Country of origin: United Kingdom
- Area served: Worldwide
- Owners: Mike and Chris Whyley
- Key people: Christopher J.M. Whyley; Michael J Whyley
- Services: Online and Desktop File Conversion & Compression
- Total equity: £597,640 (2022) £643,693 (2021) £283,958 (2020) £155,809 (2019)
- Website: www.zamzar.com
- Commercial: Yes
- Registration: Optional
- Launched: 2006
- Current status: Online

Zamzar is an online file converter and compressor, created by brothers Mike and Chris Whyley in England in 2006. It allows users to convert files online, without downloading a software tool, and supports over 1,200 different conversion types. Since its formation, the service has converted over 510 million files for users from 245 different countries. The service supports the conversion of documents, images, audio, video, e-Books, CAD files and compressed file formats.

Users can type in a URL or upload one or more files (if they are all of the same format) from their computer; Zamzar will then convert the file(s) to another user-specified format, such as an Adobe PDF file to a Microsoft Word document. Once conversion is complete, users can immediately download the file from their web browser. Users can also choose to receive an email with a link to download the converted file.

In February 2021 Zamzar expanded their tool and announced a new file compression service. The compressor is visually similar to the conversion tool with a drag and drop download feature. As with the converter, users have the option to subscribe for a paid plan if they wish to compress multiple or larger files than the free service permits

== File conversion API ==
in 2015 Zamzar launched a file conversion API, allowing users to integrate file conversion capabilities into their own websites and applications. Sample code is provided to allow users to integrate file conversion capabilities in C#, Java, Node.js, PHP, Python and cURL. Zamzar also maintains a project on GitHub which allows users to perform file conversion from the command line on Linux, MacOS or Windows systems.

== Email file conversion ==
It is also possible to send files for conversion by emailing them to Zamzar. Zamzar launched this capability in 2012, allowing users to email files to dedicated email addresses for the file to be automatically converted to a different format. A link is then emailed back to the end user to allow them to download their converted file.

== User privilege levels ==
Zamzar is currently free to use, but there is a limit of two conversions per hour for files up to 100MB. Users can pay a monthly subscription in order to access preferential features, such as unlimited file conversions, online file management, shorter response and queuing times and other benefits.

== Name ==
Its name comes from Franz Kafka's The Metamorphosis. Its main character is called Gregor Samsa and it is from his surname that Zamzar is derived. The founders of the service considered three other names – Konvertieren, Khamailen and Obrogo – before settling on Zamzar.

== See also ==
- Brooklyn Bridge (software)
