= Rollover cable =

Cable used to connect a terminal and router

Cisco rollover cable

A rollover cable (also known as a Yost cable, Cisco cable, or console cable) is a type of RS-232 serial cable with 8P8C modular connectors on both ends. The name rollover alludes to how the pinouts on one end are reversed with respect to the other, as if they had rolled over. This type of cable is commonly used by Cisco equipment to connect a computer terminal to a network appliance's console port.

Side-by-side comparison of both connectors of a rollover cable

This cabling system was invented to eliminate the differences in RS-232 wiring so that only one type of cable is needed to connect any two RS-232 devices. Most RS-232 devices can be made to fit this standard by using a simple adapter.

== See also ==
- RS-232
- 8P8C
- Serial cable
- Null modem
