= USB-to-serial adapter =

Type of protocol converter

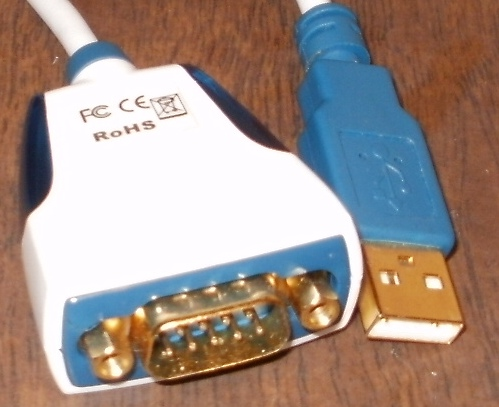
FTDI US232R: USB to RS-232 adapter cable

A USB-to-serial adapter is a type of protocol converter that is used for converting USB data signals to and from serial communications standards (serial ports). Most commonly the USB data signals are converted to either RS-232, RS-485, RS-422, or TTL-level UART serial data. The older serial RS-423 protocol is rarely used any more, so USB to RS-423 adapters are less common.

== Uses ==
USB-to-serial RS-232 adapters are often used with consumer, commercial and industrial applications and USB-to-serial RS-485/422 adapters are usually mainly used only with industrial applications. Currently, USB to TTL-level UART converters are used extensively by students and hobbyist as they can be directly interfaced to microcontrollers.

Adapters for converting USB to other standard or proprietary protocols also exist; however, these are usually not referred to as a serial adapter.

The primary application scenario is to enable USB-based computers to access and communicate with serial devices featuring D-sub (usually DE-9 or DB-25) connectors or screw terminals, where security of the data transmission is not generally an issue.

USB serial adapters can be isolated or non-isolated. The isolated version has opto-couplers and/or surge suppressors to prevent static electricity or other high-voltage surges to enter the data lines thereby preventing data loss and damage to the adapter and connected serial device. The non-isolated version has no protection against static electricity or voltage surges, which is why this version is usually recommended for only non-critical applications and at short communication ranges.

== History ==
Historically, most personal computers had a built-in D-sub serial RS-232 port, also referred to as a COM port, which could be used for connecting the computer to most types of serial RS-232 devices. By the late 1990s, many computer manufacturers started to phase out the serial COM port in favor of the USB port (in part dictated from the PC97 architecture, from Microsoft).

By the mid-2000s, some computers had both a serial COM port and a USB port; however, many no longer had a serial COM port by that time, and today most modern computers have no serial COM port but instead only USB ports.

Since many serial devices with an RS-232, RS-485 or RS-422 port are still in use and even still produced today, the disappearance of the serial COM port from personal computers has created a need for the USB to serial adapter.

== Architecture ==
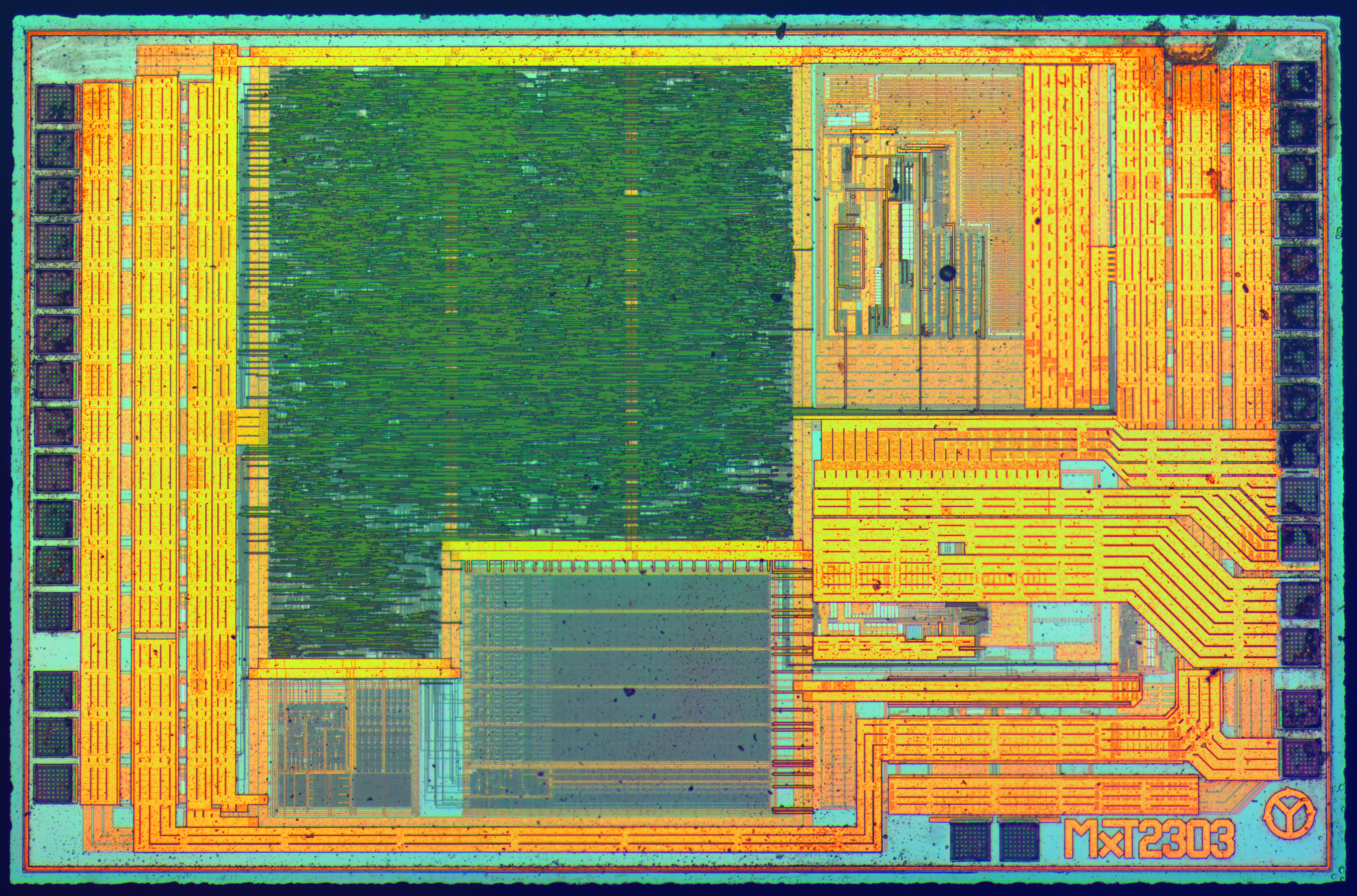
Die of a PL2303HX USB-to-serial bridge controller manufactured by Prolific Technology

As a simplified example, a typical standard USB to serial adapter consists of a USB processor chip that processes the USB signals. The USB processor sends the processed USB signals to a serial driver chip which applies the correct voltages and sends the processed data signals to the serial output.

For the computer to be able to detect and process the data signals drivers must be installed on the computer. Some chip models have drivers installed by default, including FTDI, while drivers for other chip models must be manually installed (e.g. for Windows and MacOS, WCH (Jiangsu Qin Heng) CH340, Silicon Labs 210x, Prolific PL2303).

When the USB to serial adapter is connected to the computer via the USB-port the driver on the computer creates a virtual COM port which shows up in Device Manager on Windows, and under /dev on Linux and MacOS. This virtual COM port can be accessed and used as if it was a built-in serial COM-port.

However, the characteristics of the virtual COM-port are not exactly the same as a real internal COM port, mainly due to data latency; which means that if very sensitive and precise data transfer is required, the USB to serial adapter might be unreliable and not a desired solution. Virtual COM drivers are usually available for Windows, Linux and Mac only.
