= 1-Butyl-3-methylimidazolium hexafluorophosphate =

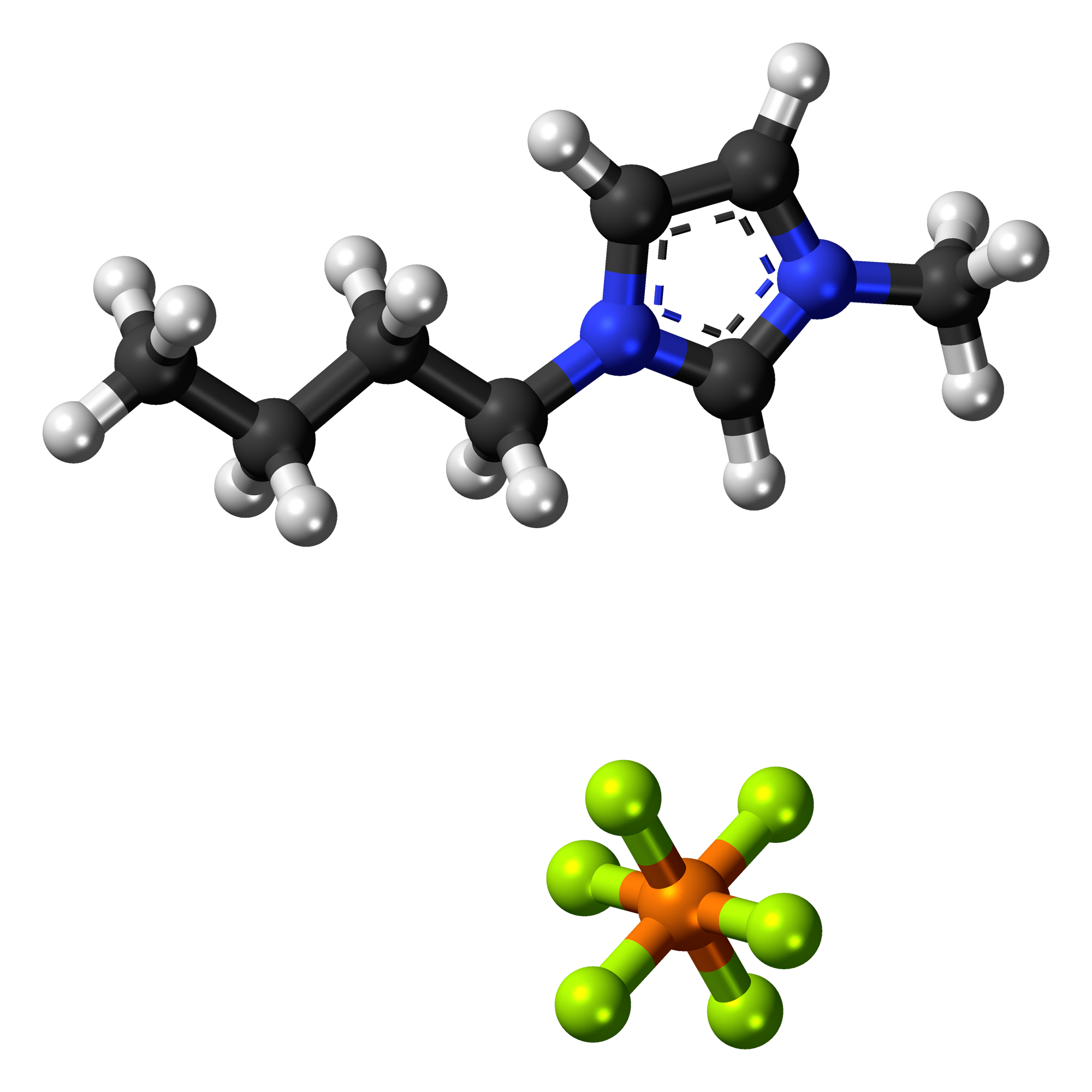

Names
- Systematic IUPAC name 1-Butyl-3-methyl-1H-imidazol-3-ium hexafluoro-λ^{5}-phosphanuide
- Other names BMIM-PF_{6}

Identifiers
CAS Number	174501-64-5
3D model (JSmol)	Interactive image; Interactive image
ChemSpider	2015930
ECHA InfoCard	100.203.179
PubChem CID	2734174
UNII	ZGE3N4O8Q9
CompTox Dashboard (EPA)	DTXSID4047911
- InChI: InChI=1S/C8H15N2.F6P/c1-3-4-5-10-7-6-9(2)8-10;1-7(2,3,4,5)6/h6-8H,3-5H2,1-2H3;/q+1;-1 Key: IXQYBUDWDLYNMA-UHFFFAOYSA-N; InChI=1/C8H15N2.F6P/c1-3-4-5-10-7-6-9(2)8-10;1-7(2,3,4,5)6/h6-8H,3-5H2,1-2H3;/q+1;-1 Key: IXQYBUDWDLYNMA-UHFFFAOYAH
- SMILES: CCCCN1C=C[N+](=C1)C.F[P-](F)(F)(F)(F)F; CCCCn1cc[n+](c1)C.F[P-](F)(F)(F)(F)F

Properties
Chemical formula	C_{8}H_{15}F_{6}N_{2}P
Molar mass	284.186 g·mol^{−1}
Appearance	Light yellow liquid
Density	1.38 g/mL (20 °C)
Melting point	−8 °C (18 °F; 265 K)
Solubility in water	insoluble
- Except where otherwise noted, data are given for materials in their standard state (at 25 °C [77 °F], 100 kPa). verify (what is ?) Infobox references

1-Butyl-3-methylimidazolium hexafluorophosphate, also commonly known as BMIM-PF_{6}, is a viscous, colourless, hydrophobic and non-water-soluble ionic liquid with a melting point of −8 °C. Together with BMIM-BF_{4}, it is one of the most extensively studied ionic liquids. It is known to very slowly decompose in the presence of water.

== Preparation and uses ==
BMIM-PF_{6} is commercially available. It may be obtained in two steps, as shown below.

1. BMIM-Cl is synthesized by alkylating the compound 1-methylimidazole with 1-chlorobutane.
2. A metathesis reaction with potassium hexafluorophosphate and the product from the previous reaction gives the desired compound. BMIM-BF_{4} may be prepared by analogously using potassium tetrafluoroborate in place of the hexafluorophosphate.

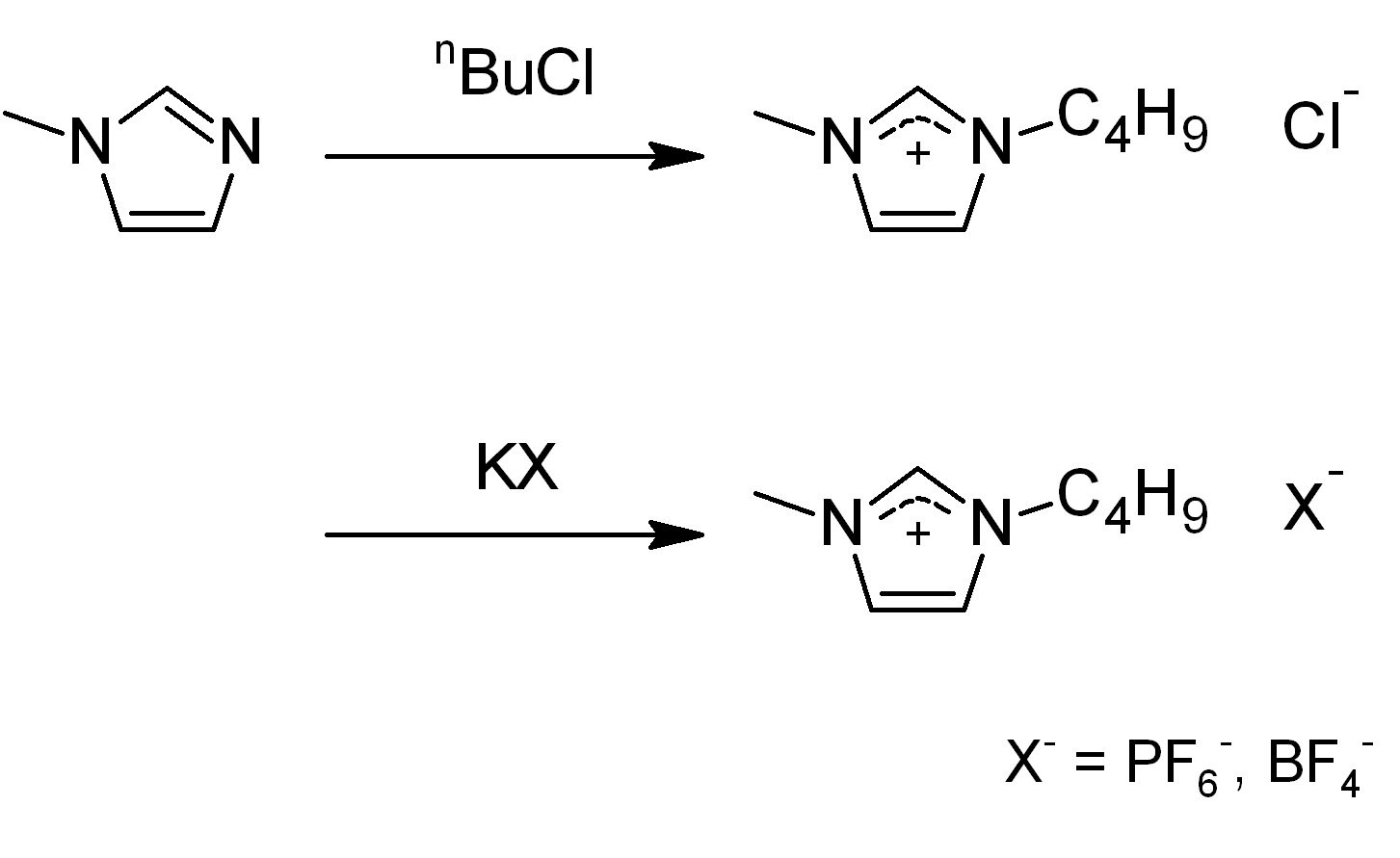

BMIM-PF_{6} has been investigated in electrochemistry where it ambiguously serves as both a solvent and an electrolyte, and it also has potential uses in electrochemical CO_{2} reduction.

== See also ==
- 1-Butyl-3-methylimidazolium tetrachloroferrate
