= C4mim =

1-Butyl-3-methylimidazolium
- Kekulé, skeletal formula of a 1-n-Butyl-3-methylimidazolium minor tautomer

Identifiers
CAS Number	80432-08-2
3D model (JSmol)	Interactive image
ChEBI	CHEBI:61333
ChEMBL	ChEMBL1198608
ChemSpider	2015918
PubChem CID	2734162
UNII	02N2G4U2OV
CompTox Dashboard (EPA)	DTXSID6047238
- InChI: InChI=1S/C8H15N2/c1-3-4-5-10-7-6-9(2)8-10/h6-8H,3-5H2,1-2H3/q+1 Key: IQQRAVYLUAZUGX-UHFFFAOYSA-N
- SMILES: CCCC[n+]1ccn(C)c1

Properties
Chemical formula	C_{8}H_{15}N_{2}^{+}
Molar mass	139.221 g·mol^{−1}
- Except where otherwise noted, data are given for materials in their standard state (at 25 °C [77 °F], 100 kPa). Infobox references

C4mim is a shorthand for the 1-butyl-3-methylimidazolium cation, where C4 refers to its butyl group. It is also abbreviated Bmim, and (uncommonly) Bumim. Its salts are usually ionic liquids. 1-Butyl-3-methylimidazolium chloride, also known as [C4mim][Cl] or BMIM-Cl, is usually used for synthesizing salts using this cation. Examples of ionic liquids containing this cation include BMIM-PF_{6}, [Bmim]BF_{4}, and C4mim-FeCl_{4}.

The formation of 1-butyl-3-methylimidazolium chloride from 1-methylimidazole and 1-chlorobutane.

These salts are currently of interest in industry due to their ability to be infinitely recycled and their tendency to participate in solvation at room temperature, possibly making them excellent green solvents.

== Structure ==
C4mim’s structure is based on its parent compound 1-butyl-3-methylimidazole except one electron is removed from its imidazole ring, making it a cation. The stability of C4mim lies in the fact that the resulting electronic vacancy is delocalized across its imidazole ring, despite these electrons being unequally distributed.

== See also ==
- Ethylammonium nitrate
