= 1,3-Dimethylimidazolium nitrate =

Ionic liquid of the imidazole family

Names
- Preferred IUPAC name 1,3-Dimethyl-1H-imidazol-3-ium nitrate

Identifiers
CAS Number	941584-21-0
3D model (JSmol)	Interactive image
ChemSpider	29322878
PubChem CID	86109826
- InChI: InChI=1S/C5H9N2.NO3/c1-6-3-4-7(2)5-6;2-1(3)4/h3-5H,1-2H3;/q+1;-1 Key: NNZONDWZDSZNGB-UHFFFAOYSA-N
- SMILES: CN1C=C[N+](=C1)C.[N+](=O)([O-])[O-]

Properties
Chemical formula	C_{5}H_{9}N_{3}O_{3}
Molar mass	159.145 g·mol^{−1}
Melting point	60–62 °C (140–144 °F; 333–335 K)
- Except where otherwise noted, data are given for materials in their standard state (at 25 °C [77 °F], 100 kPa). Infobox references

1,3-Dimethylimidazolium nitrate ([DMIM][NO3]) is a solvent within the imidazole-based class of ionic liquids (ILs). 1,3-Dimethylimidazolium is a five-membered ring aromatic cation composed of two nitrogen atoms and three carbon atoms, with methyl groups substituted at positions 1 and 3 of the nitrogen atoms, respectively. The nitrate anion is a poly-ion species characterized by one nitrogen atom and three oxygen atoms.

Thermodynamic properties of this compound are not available as it exhibits fast and often uncontrollable chemical decomposition, only limited data such as its melting and decomposition temperatures. Differential scanning calorimetry and thermogravimetric analysis has been performed to understand thermal decomposition kinetics. Computational methods have been used to probe some of the interactions with water.
