= Firmata =

Low-level communication protocol

Firmata is a low-level communication protocol that allows user space software to interact with microcontrollers. The protocol's definition is based on the MIDI Message Format.

== Message format ==
Following the MIDI standard, message bytes are broken out into "Status" bytes and "Data" bytes. Status bytes always start with a 1 in their most significant bit and data bytes start with a 0 in their most significant bit. As only 3 bits are set aside for status definitions, the MIDI format includes a special status (START_SYSEX and END_SYSEX) where the bytes between are interpreted as a command. This allows for users to define custom commands.

Status Byte Structure
Command	Bit 0	Bit 1–3	Bit 4-7 4–7	Description
Digital I/O Message	1	001	Target Port #	Send data for a digital port
Report Analog I/O	1	100	Target Pin #	Enable analog input by pin #
Report Digital I/O	1	101	Target Port #	Enable digital input by port
Analog I/O Message	1	110	Target Pin #	Send data for an analog pin
Set Pin Mod	1	111	0100	Sets pin to specific mode
System Extension Start	1	111	0000	Specifies follow bytes are status and not date
System Extension End	1	111	1000	Confirms end of status byte stream
System Reset	1	111	1111	Reset

Pin Modes
Mode Type	Value
Input	0x00
Output	0x01
Analag	0x02
PWM	0x03
Servo	0x04
Shift	0x05
I2C	0x06
Onewire	0x07
Stepper	0x08
Encoder	0x09
Serial	0x0A
Pullup	0x0B

==== System extensions ====
The following commands need to be bookended by System Extension Start/Stop bytes. As these qualify as "data" bytes, the most significant bit for all of them is a 0.

Command	Bit 0	Bit 1–3	Bit 4-7 4–7	Description
Analog Mapping Query	0	110	1001	Ask for mapping of analog pin mapping
Analog Mapping Response	0	110	1010	Response to analog mapping query
Capability Query	0	110	1011	Ask for supported modes and pin resolutions
Capability Response	0	110	1100	Response to capability query
Pin State Query	0	110	1101	Ask for a pin's current mode
Pin State Response	0	110	1110	Response to pin query
Extended Analog	0	110	1111	Write more data to an analog I/O pin
Servo Config	0	111	0000	Set Max/min angle, pulse, frequency
String Data	0	111	0001	A string message in 14 bit chunks
Shift Data	0	111	0101	Bitstream to/from a shift register
I2C Request	0	111	0110	Send an I2C read/write request
I2C Reply	0	111	0111	A reply to an I2C read request
I2C Config	0	111	1000	Config I2C settings
Report Firmware	0	111	1001	Report name and version of firmware
