= Ionic liquids in carbon capture =

The use of ionic liquids in carbon capture is a potential application of ionic liquids as absorbents for use in carbon capture and sequestration. Ionic liquids, which are salts that exist as liquids near room temperature, are polar, nonvolatile materials that have been considered for many applications. The urgency of climate change has spurred research into their use in energy-related applications such as carbon capture and storage.

== Carbon capture using absorption ==
=== Ionic liquids as solvents ===
Amines are the most prevalent absorbent in postcombustion carbon capture technology today. In particular, monoethanolamine (MEA) has been used in industrial scales in postcombustion carbon capture, as well as in other CO_{2} separations, such as "sweetening" of natural gas. However, amines are corrosive, degrade over time, and require large industrial facilities. Ionic liquids on the other hand, have low vapor pressures . This property results from their strong Coulombic attractive force. Vapor pressure remains low through the substance's thermal decomposition point (typically >300 °C). In principle, this low vapor pressure simplifies their use and makes them "green" alternatives. Additionally, it reduces risk of contamination of the CO_{2} gas stream and of leakage into the environment.

The solubility of CO_{2} in ionic liquids is governed primarily by the anion, less so by the cation. The hexafluorophosphate (PF_{6}^{–}) and tetrafluoroborate (BF_{4}^{–}) anions have been shown to be especially amenable to CO_{2} capture.

Ionic liquids have been considered as solvents in a variety of liquid-liquid extraction processes, but never commercialized. Beside that, ionic liquids have replaced the conventional volatile solvents in industry such as absorption of gases or extractive distillation. Additionally, ionic liquids are used as co-solutes for the generation of aqueous biphasic systems, or purification of biomolecules.

=== Process ===
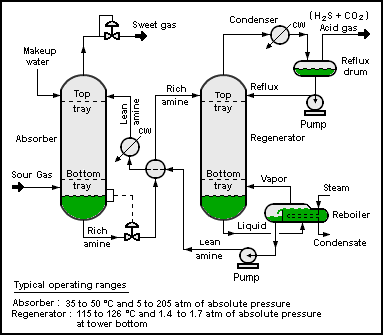
A typical amine gas treating process flow diagram. Ionic liquids for use in CO_{2} capture by absorption could follow a similar process.

A typical CO_{2} absorption process consists of a feed gas, an absorption column, a stripper column, and output streams of CO_{2}-rich gas to be sequestered, and CO_{2}-poor gas to be released to the atmosphere. Ionic liquids could follow a similar process to amine gas treating, where the CO_{2} is regenerated in the stripper using higher temperature. However, ionic liquids can also be stripped using pressure swings or inert gases, reducing the process energy requirement. A current issue with ionic liquids for carbon capture is that they have a lower working capacity than amines. Task-specific ionic liquids that employ chemisorption and physisorption are being developed in an attempt to increase the working capacity. 1-butyl-3-propylamineimidazolium tetrafluoroborate is one example of a TSIL.

=== Research ===
In 2023, a research team composed of Chuo University, Nihon University, Kanazawa University, and the Research Institute of Innovative Technology for the Earth utilized electronic state informatics to design and synthesize ionic liquids. Subsequently, they conducted precise measurements of CO_{2} solubility and successfully developed ionic liquids with the highest physical absorption capacity for CO_{2} to date.

== Drawbacks ==
=== Selectivity ===
In carbon capture an effective absorbent is one which demonstrates a high selectivity, meaning that CO_{2} will preferentially dissolve in the absorbent compared to other gaseous components. In post-combustion carbon capture the most salient separation is CO_{2} from N_{2}, whereas in pre-combustion separation CO is primarily separated from H_{2}. Other components and impurities may be present in the flue gas, such as hydrocarbons, SO_{2}, or H_{2}S. Before selecting the appropriate solvent to use for carbon capture it is critical to ensure that at the given process conditions and flue gas composition CO_{2} maintains a much higher solubility in the solvent than the other species in the flue gas and thus has a high selectivity.

The selectivity of CO_{2} in ionic liquids has been widely studied by researchers. Generally, polar molecules and molecules with an electric quadrupole moment are highly soluble in liquid ionic substances. It has been found that at high process temperatures the solubility of CO_{2} decreases, while the solubility of other species, such as CH_{4} and H_{2}, may increase with increasing temperature, thereby reducing the effectiveness of the solvent. However, the solubility of N_{2} in ionic liquids is relatively low and does not increase with increasing temperature so the use of ionic liquids in post-combustion carbon capture may be appropriate due to the consistently high CO_{2}/N_{2} selectivity. The presence of common flue gas impurities such as H_{2}S severely inhibits CO_{2} solubility in ionic liquids and should be carefully considered by engineers when choosing an appropriate solvent for a particular flue gas.

=== Viscosity ===
A primary concern with the use of ionic liquids for carbon capture is their high viscosity compared with that of commercial solvents. Ionic liquids which employ chemisorption depend on a chemical reaction between solute and solvent for CO_{2} separation. The rate of this reaction is dependent on the diffusivity of CO_{2} in the solvent and is thus inversely proportional to viscosity. The self diffusivity of CO_{2} in ionic liquids are generally to the order of 10^{−10} m^{2}/s, approximately an order of magnitude less than similarly performing commercial solvents used on CO_{2} capture. The viscosity of an ionic liquid can vary significantly according to the type of anion and cation, the alkyl chain length, and the amount of water or other impurities in the solvent. Because these solvents can be "designed" and these properties chosen, developing ionic liquids with lowered viscosities is a current topic of research. Supported ionic liquid phases (SILPs) are one proposed solution to this problem.

== Tunability ==
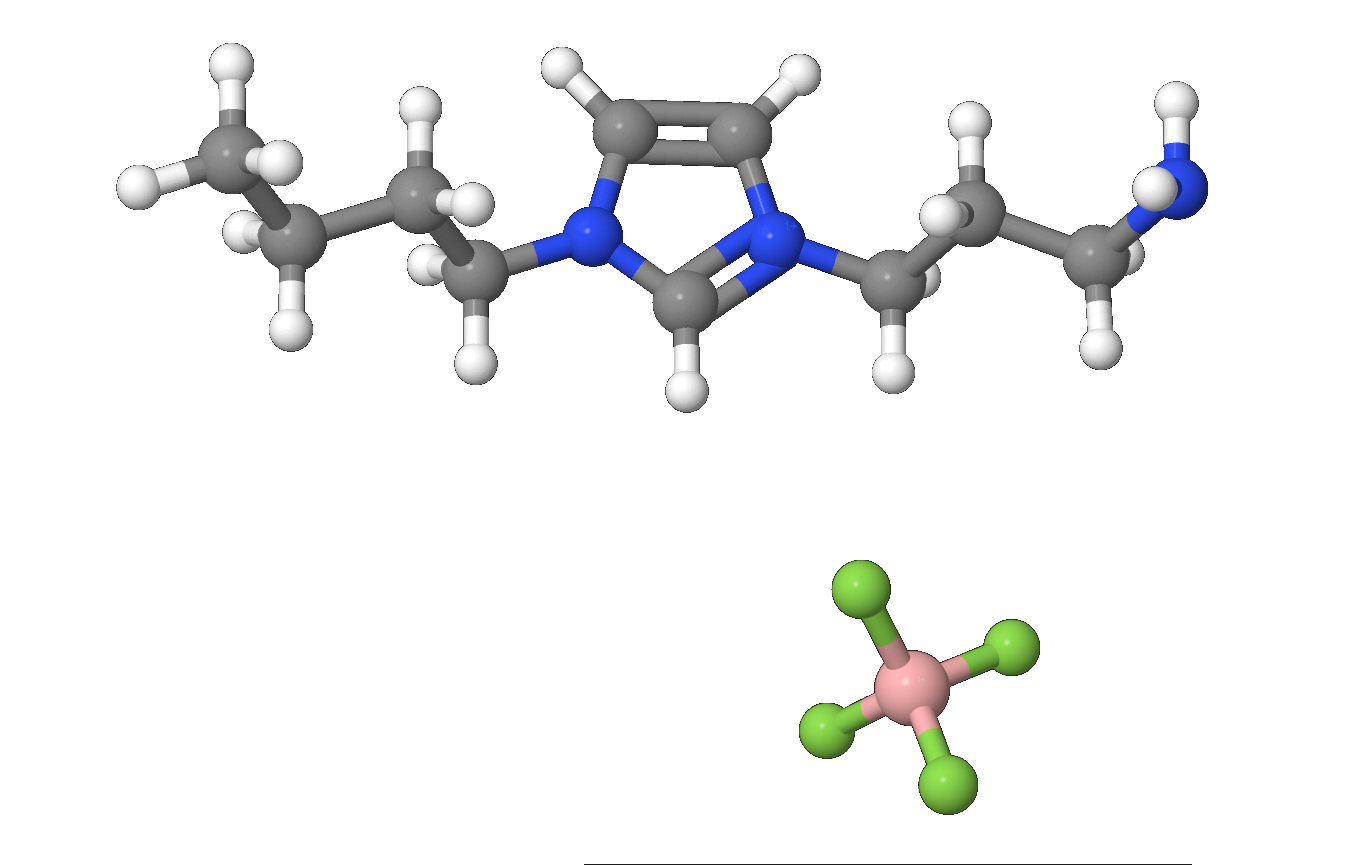
1-butyl-3-propylamineimidazolium tetrafluoroborate is a task-specific ionic liquid for use in CO_{2} separation.

As required for all separation techniques, ionic liquids exhibit selectivity towards one or more of the phases of a mixture. 1-Butyl-3-methylimidazolium hexafluorophosphate (BMIM-PF_{6}) is a room-temperature ionic liquid that was identified early on as a viable substitute for volatile organic solvents in liquid-liquid separations. Other [PF_{6}]- and [BF_{4}]- containing ionic liquids have been studied for their CO_{2} absorption properties, as well as 1-ethyl-3-methylimidazolium (EMIM) and unconventional cations like trihexyl(tetradecyl) phosphonium ([P_{66614}]). Selection of different anion and cation combinations in ionic liquids affects their selectivity and physical properties. Additionally, the organic cations in ionic liquids can be "tuned" by changing chain lengths or by substituting radicals. Finally, ionic liquids can be mixed with other ionic liquids, water, or amines to achieve different properties in terms of absorption capacity and heat of absorption. This tunability has led some to call ionic liquids "designer solvents." 1-butyl-3-propylamineimidazolium tetrafluoroborate was specifically developed for CO_{2} capture; it is designed to employ chemisorption to absorb CO_{2} and maintain efficiency under repeated absorption/regeneration cycles. Other ionic liquids have been simulated or experimentally tested for potential use as CO_{2} absorbents.

== Proposed industrial applications ==
Currently, CO_{2} capture uses mostly amine-based absorption technologies, which are energy intensive and solvent intensive. Volatile organic compounds alone in chemical processes represent a multibillion-dollar industry. Therefore, ionic liquids offer an alternative that prove attractive should their other deficiencies be addressed.

During the capture process, the anion and cation play a crucial role in the dissolution of CO_{2}. Spectroscopic results suggest a favorable interaction between the anion and CO_{2}, wherein CO_{2} molecules preferentially attach to the anion. Furthermore, intermolecular forces, such as hydrogen bonds, van der Waals bonds, and electrostatic attraction, contributes to the solubility of CO_{2} in ionic liquids. This makes ionic liquids promising candidates for CO_{2} capture because the solubility of CO_{2} can be modeled accurately by the regular solubility theory (RST), which reduces operational costs in developing more sophisticated model to monitor the capture process.
