= BMIC =

BMIC can stand for:

- Bangalore–Mysore Infrastructure Corridor
- Bay Mills Indian Community
- Boston Musical Instrument Company
- British Music Information Centre
- 1-Butyl-3-methylimidazolium chloride
