= Chlorine-free germanium processing =

Germanium production methods

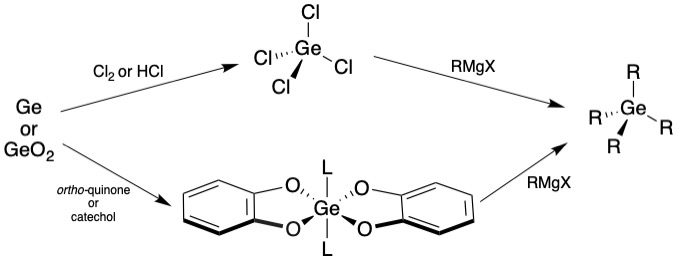
Chlorine-free synthesis of tetraorganogermanes in comparison to the traditional synthesis utilizing chlorine.

Chlorine-free germanium processing are methods of germanium activation to form useful germanium precursors in a more energy efficient and environmentally friendly way compared to traditional synthetic routes. Germanium tetrachloride is a valuable intermediate for the synthesis of many germanium complexes. Normal synthesis of it involves an energy-intensive dehydration of germanium oxide, $\ce{GeO2}$, with hydrogen chloride, $\ce{HCl}$ Due to the environmental and safety impact of non-recyclable, high energy reactions with $\ce{HCl}$, an alternative synthesis of a shelf-stable germanium intermediate precursor without chlorine is of interest. In 2017, a synthesis of organogermanes, $\ce{GeR4}$ without using chloride species was reported, allowing for a much more environmentally friendly and low energy synthesis using $\ce{GeO2}$, $\ce{Ge(0)}$, and even selectively activating germanium in the presence of zinc oxide ($\ce{ZnO}$), resulting in products that are bench stable and solid.

== Synthesis of organogermanes ==
=== Oxidation of germanium metal ===
Glavinović et al. have synthesized organogermanes using ortho-quinone, which is both redox "non-innocent" and acts as a pseudo-halide, resulting in an air and moisture stable beige solid. Referring to the scheme below, when $\ce{Ge(0)}$, ortho-quinone, and pyridine (acting as an auxiliary ligand) were milled via liquid assisted grinding in a 1:1 mixture of toluene and water, the resulting organogermane was recrystallized in toluene resulting in 88% yield. In this reaction, the quinone ligands each undergo a two-electron oxidation, resulting in the $\ce{Ge(0)}$ oxidized to $\ce{Ge(IV)}$. This reaction was shown to work both at the milligram and the gram scale, proving its efficiency in the bulk scale.

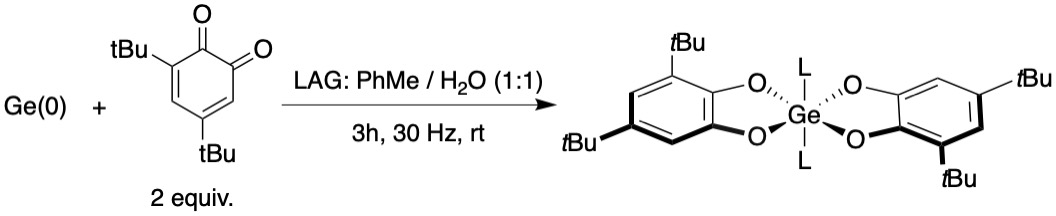
Oxidation of Ge(0) to yield the bis(catecholate) germanium compound using an ortho-quinone.

=== Dehydration of GeO_{2} ===
Following a nearly identical reaction scheme as the oxidation of germanium metal with ortho-quinone, dehydration of $\ce{GeO2}$ with catechol ligands results in the same product as the oxidation product, with similar yield 74% on milligram scale and 84% on the gram scale. This particular scheme is of much note since the sole byproduct of this reaction is water. These reactions could provide an alternative to normal oxide separations for other metals that are energy intensive and otherwise wasteful.

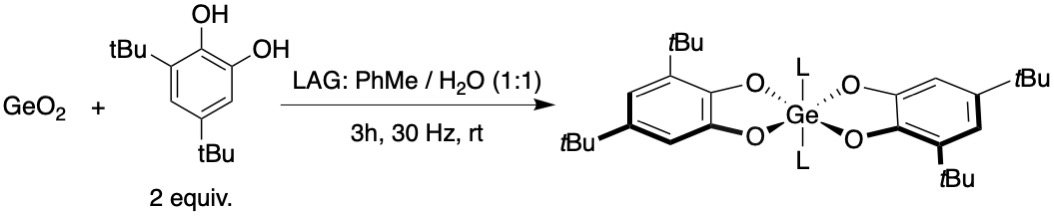
Dehydration of germanium oxide to form the bis(catecholate) germanium complex using optimized LAG conditions.

=== Extraction from ZnO ===
Industrially, germanium can be extracted from $\ce{ZnO}$, contains amounts of $\ce{GeO2}$. Using $\ce{HCl}$, the key product of $\ce{GeCl4}$ and $\ce{ZnCl2}$ byproduct can be produced. The zinc byproduct can be distilled at high temperatures, leaving only germanium tetrachloride. A new method of chlorine-free germanium processing proposed in 2018 has proven effective in extracting germanium from zinc oxide, giving hope to replace the $\ce{HCl}$ leaching and distillation process currently employed by industry. In both 1:1 and 1:5 mass ratios of $\ce{GeO2}$ and $\ce{ZnO}$, germanium oxide was selectively activated by simple addition of catechol, and letting the reaction proceed under the same conditions as the dehydration reaction. The unreacted zinc oxide can be washed away with dichloromethane and the bis(catecholate) germanium product recrystallized in cyclohexane. Despite zinc oxide being present in the reaction vessel, the intermediate germanium product yields remain high, being 64 and 66%. This method, as well as other halogen-free germanium extraction methods, make the possibility of halogen free germanium processing a future possibility.

=== Other auxiliary ligands ===
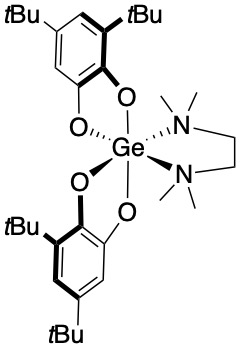
Bis(catecholate) germanium complex with a chelating diamine ligand.

The mechanochemical activation of germanium described above can be used with a variety of auxiliary amine-based ligands and not just pyridine as used in the syntheses above. Uni-dentate ligands such as N-methyl imidazole can be used to create a trans-disposed octahedral germanium product, isostructural to the complexes of both the catechol and ortho-quinone that contain pyridine. However, chelating ligands can be used to form the product with nitrogens cis to each other. For example, in a reaction using tetramethylethylenediamine as a chelating bi-dentate diamine affords the cis- product with catechol ligands at the other octahedral binding sites. More research as additionally been done to show that the nitrogen-containing ligands can be biologically active ones which operate at very low reduction potentials. This makes the germanium complexes with those ligands easily reducible and highly nucleophilic, making substitution and activation even easier.

== Substitution reactions ==
=== Substitutions to form tetraorganogermanes ===
==== Reagents and products ====
The intermediates prepared by the above method are able to easily undergo substitution reactions with nucleophiles to form tetraorganogermanes, $\ce{GeR4}$, of which include, $\ce{GeH4}$, Germane. Germane is a key material in optical and electronic device fabrication. These substitution reactions return the original catechol ligand, making this germanium activation process easily recyclable. A solution of 20 equivalents of an alkyl or aryl Grignard reagent in tetrahydrofuran, combined with bis(catecholate) complex leads to a homogeneous solution of reagents in THF. Refluxing this solution for 24 hours yields the Grignard product organogermane in relatively high yield across multiple reagents. The figure below shows different reagents used by Glavinović et al, showing the efficacy of the substitution reaction.

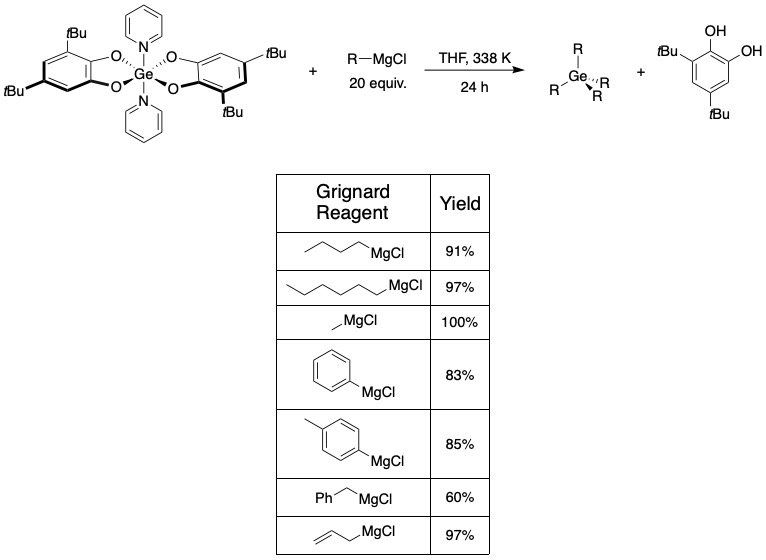
Substitution of the bis(catecholate) germanium complex with a variety of Grignard reagents and the product yield as measured by Glavinović et al.

==== Proposed mechanism ====
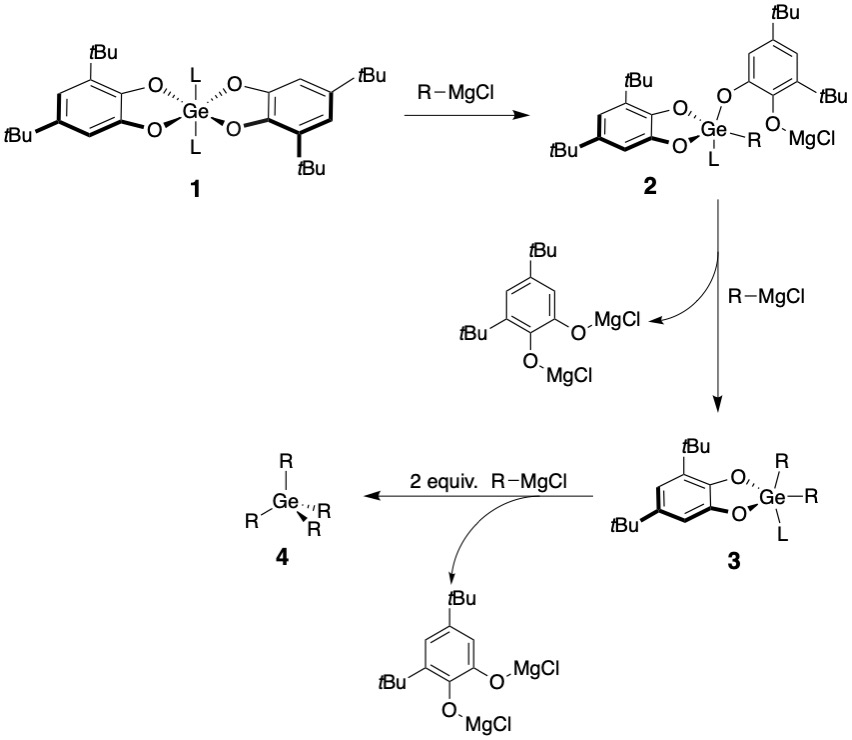
Proposed mechanism for substitution of the cis(catecholate) germanium complexes with Grignard reagents.

The substitution reaction described above is thought to process via a mechanism in which steric strain of the complex is slowly alleviated over the course of the reaction. The first Grignard reagent substitutes the most sterically hindered oxygen position, where the t-butyl group of the catechol ligand is alpha to the oxygen. The second Grignard reagent substitutes the now uni-dentate catechol-grignard adduct, removing the ligand and resulting in two complete substitutions. Referring to the scheme below, treating intermediate 2 with an additional equivalent of Grignard reagent yields 3 at a faster rate than the rate to make 2, and treatment of 3 with two equivalents of reagent yields 4 at even more quickly. This is starkly different from the substitution reactions of $\ce{GeCl4}$, in which the germanium center becomes more sterically hindered over the course of the reaction as ligand exchange of the carbons and the chlorides progresses, making the substitution more difficult.

Ratio of products lends validity to the proposed mechanism, that substitution occurs at the most substituted oxygen first.

The stereochemical selectivity of the substitution reaction is further enforced by the identity of the auxiliary amine ligand. By using a more sterically encumbered amine ligand such as triethylamine, a 1.67:1 mixture of dibutyl-germane-η^{2}-catecholate and tributylgermyl-η^{1}-catecholate is produced after substitution with two equivalents of $\ce{BuMgCl}$. This proves the effect of steric encumbrance on the product of the substitution reaction as the resulting tri-substituted product has the least sterically encumbered oxygen remaining bonded to the catecholate. This reaction pathway could allow new synthetic pathways for more stereo complex and functionalized germanium complexes.

=== Substitution to form germane ===
Despite being highly volatile and toxic, germane, $\ce{GeH4}$, is extremely important in the field of optoelectronics and is a good candidate for vapor deposition to form thin films of germanium. However, germane must be extremely pure to use in such a way, and much research has gone into developing methodologies to prepare and purify germane. Using bis(catecholate) germanium and lithium aluminum hydride ($\ce{LiAlH4}$) in dibutyl ether with argon as a carrier gas, the substitution reaction yields high purity germane in the Ar carrier gas with no evolution of volatile Ge byproducts. This reaction pathway for production of germane requires no postsynthetic processing or purification, proving this to be more advantageous than current methods.

Substitution of bis(catecholate) germanium complex with lithium aluminum hydride to make germane.
