= Tribotronics =

Interaction of triboelectricity and semiconductor band structure.

Tribotronics is about the research on interaction between triboelectricity and semiconductor, which is using triboelectric potential controlling electrical transport and transformation in semiconductors for information sensing and active control (info-tribotronics), and using semiconductors managing triboelectric power transfer and conversion in circuits for power management and efficient utilization (power-tribotronics).

== Definition ==
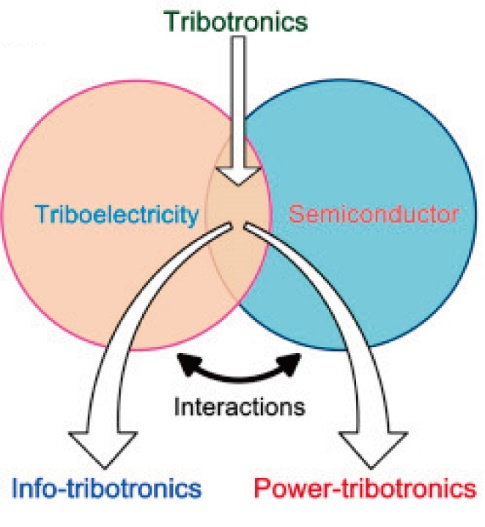
Schematic diagram showing the coupling between triboelectricity and semiconductor

The tribotronics can be divided into info-tribotronics and power-tribotronics. The tribotronic devices, such as tribotronic transistor, contact-gated OLED, touch memory, wind-enhanced photocell, sliding tunable diode, tactile sensing array, stretchable transistor and nanoscale transistor have all demonstrated controlled electronics by triboelectric potential for information sensing and active control, which are belonging to info-tribotronics. On the other hand, the power-tribotronics can demonstrate manageable triboelectric power by electronics for power management and efficient utilization, such as the tribotronic energy extractor, the power management module, and so on.

== Mechanism ==
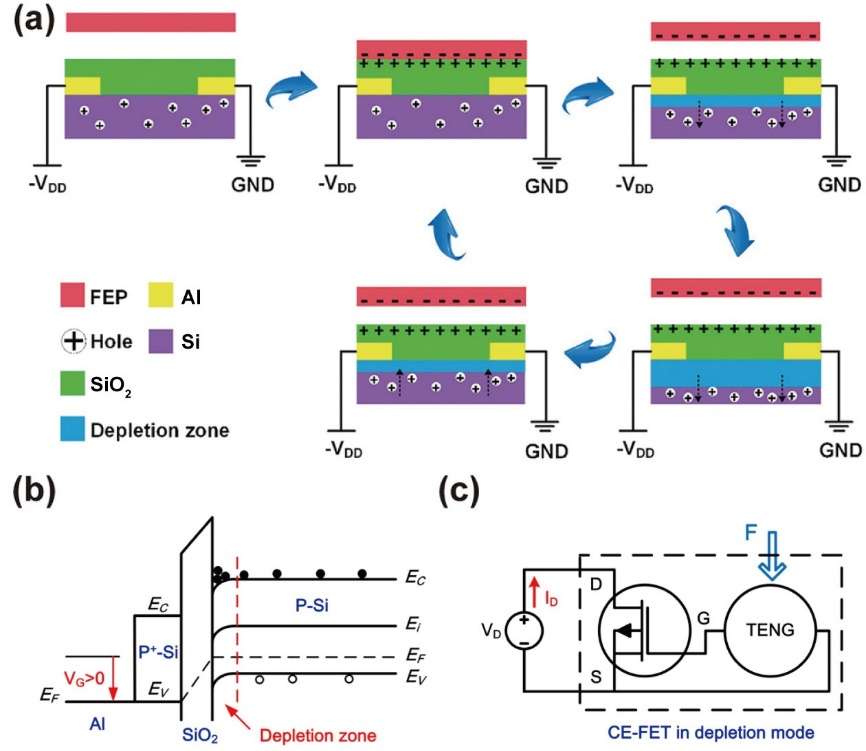
Working mechanism for info-tribotronics

As a fundamental info-tribotronic unit, contact electrification field-effect transistor (CE-FET) composed of a metal–oxide–semiconductor field-effect transistor (MOSFET) without top-gate electrode and a mobile layer is analyzed. Different from the conventional MOSFET, the externally applied gate voltage source is replaced by the mobile layer, which can vertically contact to and separate from the insulator layer by the external force. When the fluorinated ethylene propylene (FEP) film contacts with the insulator layer, the SiO_{2} has positive charges while the FEP has negative charges. When the mobile layer gradually separated, a positive inner gate voltage for the MOSFET is generated. Therefore, a depletion zone will be formed, which will decrease the channel width and thus the drain current. The CE-FET can be considered as the coupling of the MOSFET and the (triboelectric nanogenerator) TENG, in which the inner gate voltage can be generated and the carrier transport between drain and source can be tuned/controlled by the external contact instead of the conventional gate voltage.

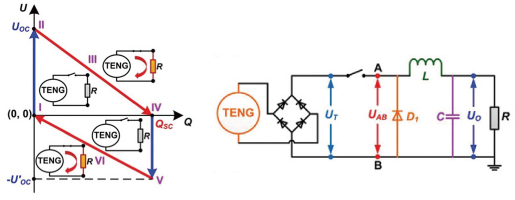
Working mechanism for power-tribotronics

To understand the potential maximal energy of TENG and develop the power management strategy, the cycles for maximized energy output of TENG (CMEO) are first elaborated. The output energy of TENG in one cycle E can be expressed in U-Q plot and calculated as the encircled area of the closed loop, where U is the built-up voltage and Q is the transferred charge. Meanwhile, the encircled area can be enlarged for CMEO by using a sequential switch. Although the energy could be maximally released to the resistor, the voltage is still a pulse high voltage that is not enough for directly powering the electronics. Therefore, the pulse high voltage should be converted to a steady low DC voltage, in which a classical DC–DC buck convertor is integrated to form an AC–DC buck conversion circuit. The DC–DC buck convertor is composed of a parallel freewheeling diode, a serial inductor, and a parallel capacitor that are connected in sequence between the switch and the resistor.
