= 1-Butyl-3-methylimidazolium tetrachloroferrate =

Magnetic ionic liquid

Identifiers
CAS Number	359845-21-9
3D model (JSmol)	Interactive image
ChemSpider	9849184
ECHA InfoCard	100.203.250
EC Number	678-175-3
PubChem CID	11674455
CompTox Dashboard (EPA)	DTXSID0049282
- InChI: InChI=1S/C8H15N2.4ClH.Fe/c1-3-4-5-10-7-6-9(2)8-10;;;;;/h6-8H,3-5H2,1-2H3;4*1H;/q+1;;;;;+3/p-4 Key: FYHLFBVHUIJIII-UHFFFAOYSA-J
- SMILES: CCCCN1C=C[N+](=C1)C.Cl[Fe-](Cl)(Cl)Cl

Properties
Chemical formula	C_{8}H_{15}Cl_{4}FeN_{2}
Molar mass	336.87 g·mol^{−1}

Hazards
- GHS labelling
Pictograms	(GHS07: Exclamation mark)
Signal word	Warning
Hazard statements	H315, H319
Precautionary statements	P264, P264+P265, P280, P302+P352, P305+P351+P338, P321, P332+P317, P337+P317, P362+P364
- Except where otherwise noted, data are given for materials in their standard state (at 25 °C [77 °F], 100 kPa). Infobox references

1-Butyl-3-methylimidazolium tetrachloroferrate is a magnetic ionic liquid whose appearance resembles that of honey. It can be obtained from reacting 1-butyl-3-methylimidazolium chloride and ferric chloride resulting in a Lewis acid-base reaction. It has quite low water solubility. It is highly polar.

Due to the presence of the high spin anion FeCl^{−}_{4}, the liquid is paramagnetic and reportedly has a magnetic susceptibility of 40.6 × 10^{−6} emu g^{−1}. A small neodymium magnet is able to attract this liquid in a test tube.
