= Potassium hexafluorophosphate =

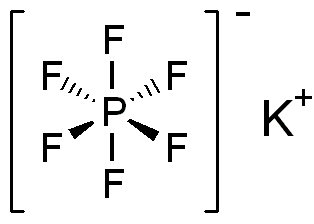

Names
- IUPAC name Potassium hexafluorophosphate

Identifiers
CAS Number	17084-13-8
3D model (JSmol)	Interactive image
ChemSpider	146640
ECHA InfoCard	100.037.388
EC Number	241-143-0
PubChem CID	23688904
UNII	88W436PDI9
CompTox Dashboard (EPA)	DTXSID50884958
- InChI: InChI=1S/F6P.K/c1-7(2,3,4,5)6;/q-1;+1 Key: YZDGRYDIGCWVND-UHFFFAOYSA-N; InChI=1/F6P.K/c1-7(2,3,4,5)6;/q-1;+1 Key: YZDGRYDIGCWVND-UHFFFAOYAC
- SMILES: [K+].F[P-](F)(F)(F)(F)F

Properties
Chemical formula	K[PF_{6}]
Molar mass	184.0625 g/mol
Appearance	colourless solid
Density	2.75 g/cm^{3}
Melting point	575 °C (1,067 °F; 848 K)
Solubility in water	8.35g/100 mL (25 °C)

Hazards
- Occupational safety and health (OHS/OSH)
Main hazards	Toxic
- GHS labelling
Pictograms	(GHS05: Corrosive) (GHS07: Exclamation mark)
Signal word	Danger
Hazard statements	H302, H314, H319
Precautionary statements	P260, P264, P270, P280, P301+P312, P301+P330+P331, P303+P361+P353, P304+P340, P305+P351+P338, P310, P321, P330, P337+P313, P363, P405, P501
NFPA 704 (fire diamond)	2 0 0
- Except where otherwise noted, data are given for materials in their standard state (at 25 °C [77 °F], 100 kPa). verify (what is ?) Infobox references

Potassium hexafluorophosphate is a chemical compound with the formula KPF_{6}. This colourless salt consists of potassium cations and hexafluorophosphate anions. It is prepared from phosphorus pentachloride:

PCl_{5} + KCl + 6 HF → KPF_{_{6}} + 6 HCl

This exothermic reaction is conducted in liquid hydrogen fluoride. The salt is stable in a hot alkaline aqueous solution, from which it can be recrystallized. The sodium and ammonium salts are more soluble in water whereas the rubidium and caesium salts are less so.

KPF_{6} is a common laboratory source of the hexafluorophosphate anion, a non-coordinating anion that confers lipophilicity to its salts.
