= Ionic liquid =

Salt in the liquid state

The chemical structure of 1-butyl-3-methylimidazolium hexafluorophosphate ([BMIM]PF_{6}), a common ionic liquid.

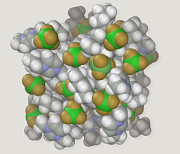
Proposed structure of an imidazolium-based ionic liquid.

An ionic liquid (IL) is a salt in the liquid state at ambient conditions. In some contexts, the term has been restricted to salts whose melting point is below a specific temperature, such as 100 °C (212 °F). While ordinary liquids such as water and gasoline are predominantly made of electrically neutral molecules, ionic liquids are largely made of ions. These substances are variously called liquid electrolytes, ionic melts, ionic fluids, fused salts, liquid salts, or ionic glasses.

Ionic liquids have many potential applications. They are powerful solvents and can be used as electrolytes. Salts that are liquid at near-ambient temperature are important for electric battery applications, and have been considered as sealants due to their very low vapor pressure.

Any salt that melts without decomposing or vaporizing usually yields an ionic liquid. Sodium chloride (NaCl), for example, melts at 801 °C (1,474 °F) into a liquid that consists largely of sodium cations (Na^{+}) and chloride anions (Cl^{−}). Conversely, when an ionic liquid is cooled, it often forms an ionic solid—which may be either crystalline or glassy.

The ionic bond is usually stronger than the Van der Waals forces between the molecules of ordinary liquids. Because of these strong interactions, salts tend to have high lattice energies, manifested in high melting points. Some salts, especially those with organic cations, have low lattice energies and thus are liquid at or below room temperature. Examples include compounds based on the 1-ethyl-3-methylimidazolium (EMIM) cation and include: EMIM:Cl, EMIMAc (acetate anion), EMIM dicyanamide, (C_{2}H_{5})(CH_{3})C_{3}H_{3}N^{+}_{2}·N(CN)^{−}_{2}, that melts at −21 °C (−6 °F); and 1-butyl-3,5-dimethylpyridinium bromide which becomes a glass below −24 °C (−11 °F).

Low-temperature ionic liquids can be compared to ionic solutions, liquids that contain both ions and neutral molecules, and in particular to the so-called deep eutectic solvents, mixtures of ionic and non-ionic solid substances which have much lower melting points than the pure compounds. Certain mixtures of nitrate salts can have melting points below 100 °C.

== History ==
The term "ionic liquid" in the general sense was used as early as 1943.

The discovery date of the "first" ionic liquid is disputed, along with the identity of its discoverer. Ethanolammonium nitrate (m.p. 52–55 °C) was reported in 1888 by S. Gabriel and J. Weiner. In 1911 Ray and Rakshit, during preparation of the nitrite salts of ethylamine, dimethylamine, and trimethylamine observed that the reaction between ethylamine hydrochloride and silver nitrate yielded an unstable ethylammonium nitrite (C_{2}H_{5})NH^{+}_{3}·NO^{−}_{2} , a heavy yellow liquid which on immersion in a mixture of salt and ice could not be solidified and was probably the first report of room-temperature ionic liquid. Later in 1914, Paul Walden reported one of the first stable room-temperature ionic liquids ethylammonium nitrate (C_{2}H_{5})NH^{+}_{3}·NO^{−}_{3} (m.p. 12 °C). In the 1970s and 1980s, ionic liquids based on alkyl-substituted imidazolium and pyridinium cations, with halide or tetrahalogenoaluminate anions, were developed as potential electrolytes in batteries.

For the imidazolium halogenoaluminate salts, their physical properties—such as viscosity, melting point, and acidity—could be adjusted by changing the alkyl substituents and the imidazolium/pyridinium and halide/halogenoaluminate ratios. Two major drawbacks for some applications were moisture sensitivity and acidity or basicity. In 1992, Wilkes and Zawarotko obtained ionic liquids with 'neutral' weakly coordinating anions such as hexafluorophosphate (PF^{−}_{6}) and tetrafluoroborate (BF^{−}_{4}), allowing a much wider range of applications.

== Characteristics ==
ILs are typically colorless viscous liquids. They are often moderate to poor conductors of electricity, and rarely self-ionize. They do, however, have a very large electrochemical window, enabling electrochemical refinement of otherwise intractable ores.

They exhibit low vapor pressure, which can be as low as 10^{−10} Pa. Many have low combustibility and are thermally stable.

The solubility properties of ILs are diverse. Saturated aliphatic compounds are generally only sparingly soluble in ionic liquids, whereas alkenes show somewhat greater solubility, and aldehydes often completely miscible. Solubility differences can be exploited in biphasic catalysis, such as hydrogenation and hydrocarbonylation processes, allowing for relatively easy separation of products and/or unreacted substrate(s). Gas solubility follows the same trend, with carbon dioxide gas showing good solubility in many ionic liquids. Carbon monoxide is less soluble in ionic liquids than in many popular organic solvents, and hydrogen is only slightly soluble (similar to the solubility in water) and may vary relatively little between the more common ionic liquids. The miscibility of ionic liquids with water or organic solvents varies with side chain lengths on the cation and with choice of anion. They can be functionalized to act as acids, bases, or ligands, and are precursors salts in the preparation of stable carbenes. Because of their distinctive properties, ionic liquids have been investigated for many applications.

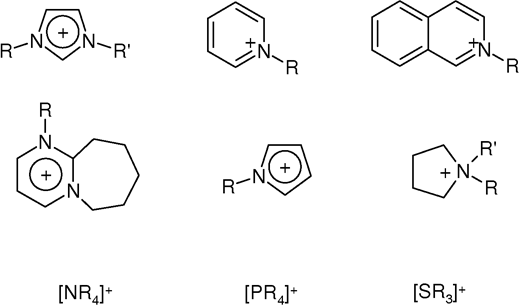
Cations commonly found in ionic liquids

Some ionic liquids can be distilled under vacuum conditions at temperatures near 300 °C. The vapor is not made up of separated ions, but consists of ion pairs.

ILs have a wide liquid range. Some ILs do not freeze down to very low temperatures (even −150 °C), The glass transition temperature was detected below −100 °C in the case of N-methyl-N-alkylpyrrolidinium cations fluorosulfonyl-trifluoromethanesulfonylimide (FTFSI). Low-temperature ionic liquids (below 130 K) have been proposed as the fluid base for an extremely large diameter spinning liquid-mirror telescope to be based on the Moon.

Water is a common impurity in ionic liquids, as it can be absorbed from the atmosphere and influences the transport properties of RTILs, even at relatively low concentrations.

== Varieties ==
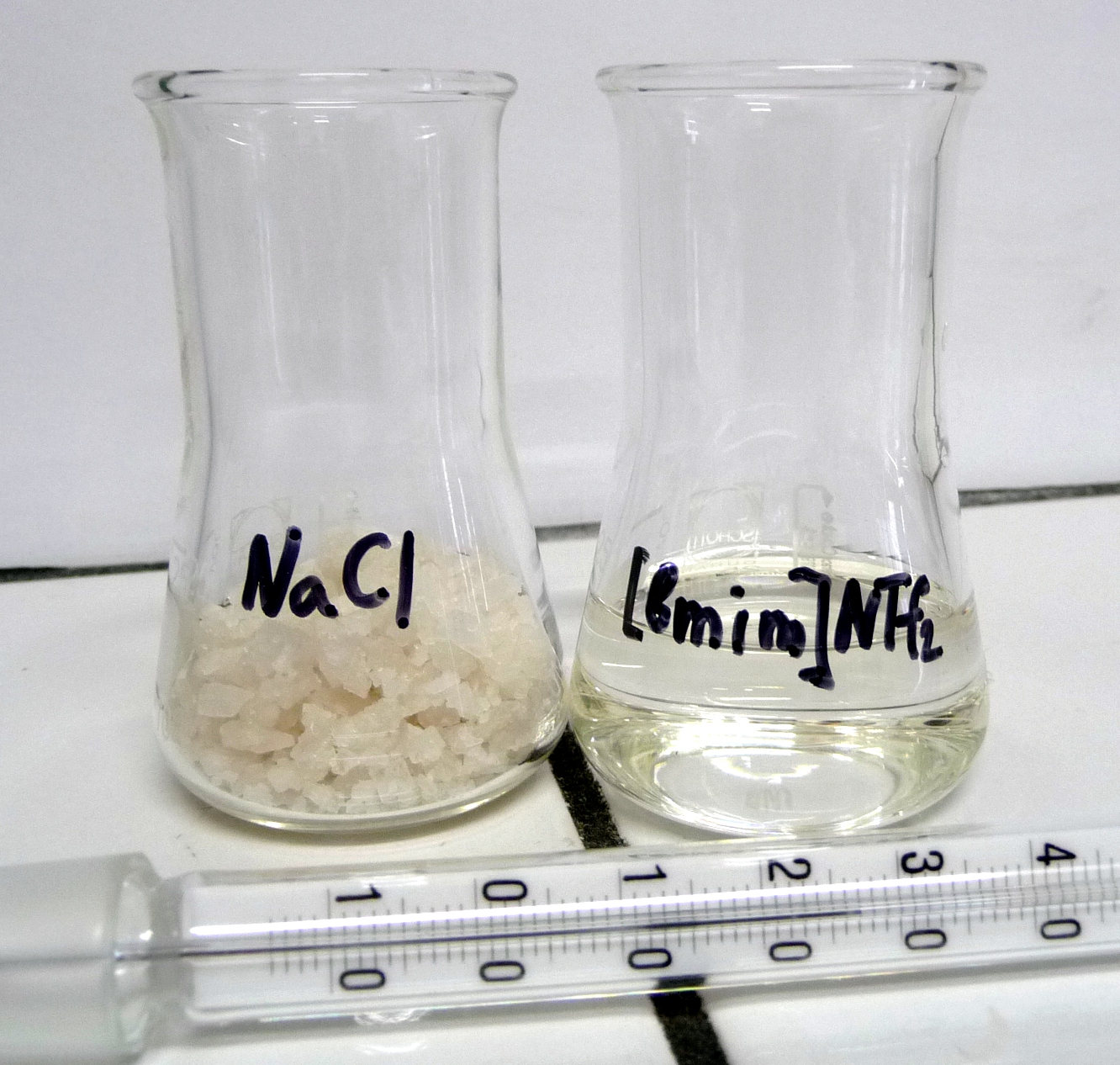
Table salt NaCl and ionic liquid 1-butyl-3-methylimidazolium bis(trifluoromethylsulfonyl)imide at 27 °С

Classically, ILs consist of salts of unsymmetrical, flexible organic cations with symmetrical weakly coordinating anions. Both cationic and anionic components have been widely varied.

=== Cations ===
Room-temperature ionic liquids (RTILs) are dominated by salts derived from 1-methylimidazole, i.e., 1-alkyl-3-methylimidazolium. Examples include 1-ethyl-3-methyl- (EMIM), 1-butyl-3-methyl- (BMIM), 1-octyl-3 methyl (OMIM), 1-decyl-3-methyl-(DMIM), 1-dodecyl-3-methyl- (dodecylMIM). Other imidazolium cations are 1-butyl-2,3-dimethylimidazolium (BMMIM or DBMIM) and 1,3-di(N,N-dimethylaminoethyl)-2-methylimidazolium (DAMI). Other N-heterocyclic cations are derived from pyridine: 4-methyl-N-butyl-pyridinium (MBPy) and N-octylpyridinium (C8Py). Conventional quaternary ammonium cations also form ILs, e.g. tetraethylammonium (TEA) and tetrabutylammonium (TBA).

=== Anions ===
Typical anions in ionic liquids include the following: tetrafluoroborate (BF_{4}), hexafluorophosphate (PF_{6}), bis-trifluoromethanesulfonimide (NTf_{2}), trifluoromethanesulfonate (OTf), dicyanamide (N(CN)_{2}), hydrogensulfate (HSO^{−}_{4}), and ethyl sulfate (EtOSO_{3}). Magnetic ionic liquids can be synthesized by incorporating paramagnetic anions, illustrated by 1-butyl-3-methylimidazolium tetrachloroferrate.

==== Specialized ILs ====
Protic ionic liquids are formed via a proton transfer from an acid to a base. In contrast to other ionic liquids, which generally are formed through a sequence of synthesis steps, protic ionic liquids can be created more easily by simply mixing the acid and base.

Phosphonium cations (R_{4}P^{+}) are less common but offer some advantageous properties. Some examples of phosphonium cations are trihexyl(tetradecyl)phosphonium (P_{6,6,6,14}) and tributyl(tetradecyl)phosphonium (P_{4,4,4,14}).

=== Poly(ionic liquid)s ===
Polymerized ionic liquids, poly(ionic liquid)s or polymeric ionic liquids, all abbreviated as PIL is the polymeric form of ionic liquids. They have half of the ionicity of ionic liquids since one ion is fixed as the polymer moiety to form a polymeric chain. PILs have a similar range of applications, comparable with those of ionic liquids but the polymer architecture provides a better chance for controlling the ionic conductivity. They have extended the applications of ionic liquids for designing smart materials or solid electrolytes.

== Commercial applications ==
Many applications have been considered, but few have been commercialized. ILs are used in the production of gasoline by catalyzing alkylation.

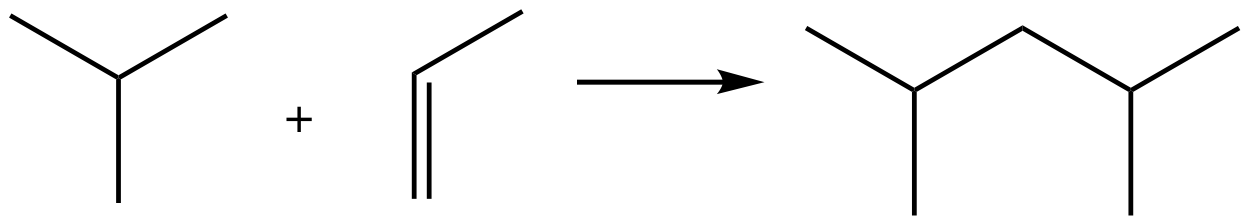
IL-catalyzed route to 2,4-dimethylpentane (gasoline component) as practiced by Chevron.

An IL based on tetraalkylphosphonium iodide is a solvent for tributyltin iodide, which functions as a catalyst to rearrange the monoepoxide of butadiene. This process was commercialized as a route to 2,5-dihydrofuran, but later discontinued.

== Potential applications ==
=== Catalysis ===
ILs improve the catalytic performance of palladium nanoparticles. Furthermore, ionic liquids can be used as pre-catalysts for chemical transformations. In this regard dialkylimidazoliums such as [EMIM]Ac have been used in the combination with a base to generate N-heterocyclic carbenes (NHCs). These imidazolium based NHCs are known to catalyse a number transformations such as the benzoin condensation and the OTHO reaction.

=== Pharmaceuticals ===
Recognizing that approximately 50% of commercial pharmaceuticals are salts, ionic liquid forms of a number of pharmaceuticals have been investigated. Combining a pharmaceutically active cation with a pharmaceutically active anion leads to a Dual Active ionic liquid in which the actions of two drugs are combined.

ILs can extract specific compounds from plants for pharmaceutical, nutritional and cosmetic applications, such as the antimalarial drug artemisinin from the plant Artemisia annua.

=== Biopolymer processing ===
The dissolution of cellulose by ILs has attracted interest. A patent application from 1930 showed that 1-alkylpyridinium chlorides dissolve cellulose. Following in the footsteps of the lyocell process, which uses hydrated N-methylmorpholine N-oxide as a solvent for pulp and paper. The "valorization" of cellulose, i.e. its conversion to more valuable chemicals, has been achieved by the use of ionic liquids. Representative products are glucose esters, sorbitol, and alkylgycosides. IL 1-butyl-3-methylimidazolium chloride dissolves freeze-dried banana pulp and with an additional 15% dimethyl sulfoxide, lends itself to carbon-13 NMR analysis. In this way the entire complex of starch, sucrose, glucose, and fructose can be monitored as a function of banana ripening.

Beyond cellulose, ILs have also shown potential in the dissolution, extraction, purification, processing and modification of other biopolymers such as chitin/chitosan, starch, alginate, collagen, gelatin, keratin, and fibroin. For example, ILs allow for the preparation of biopolymer materials in different forms (e.g. sponges, films, microparticles, nanoparticles, and aerogels) and better biopolymer chemical reactions, leading to biopolymer-based drug/gene-delivery carriers. Moreover, ILs enable the synthesis of chemically modified starches with high efficiency and degrees of substitution (DS) and the development of various starch-based materials such as thermoplastic starch, composite films, solid polymer electrolytes, nanoparticles and drug carriers.

=== Nuclear fuel reprocessing ===
The IL 1-butyl-3-methylimidazolium chloride has been investigated for the recovery of uranium and other metals from spent nuclear fuel and other sources.

=== Solar thermal energy ===
ILs are potential heat transfer and storage media in solar thermal energy systems. Concentrating solar thermal facilities such as parabolic troughs and solar power towers focus the sun's energy onto a receiver, which can generate temperatures of around 600 °C (1,112 °F). This heat can then generate electricity in a steam or other cycle. For buffering during cloudy periods or to enable generation overnight, energy can be stored by heating an intermediate fluid. Although nitrate salts have been the medium of choice since the early 1980s, they freeze at 220 °C (428 °F) and thus require heating to prevent solidification. Ionic liquids such as [C_{4}mim][BF_{4}] have more favorable liquid-phase temperature ranges (−75 to 459 °C) and could therefore be excellent liquid thermal storage media and heat transfer fluids.

=== Waste recycling ===
Ionic liquids have been investigated as solvents and reaction media for recycling processes, including polymer recycling and metal recovery. In polymer recycling, ionic liquids can support selective dissolution and purification steps in solvent-based recycling, and they have also been explored as media that influence depolymerization pathways for some condensation polymers (e.g., polyamides and polyesters). For practical implementation, efficient recovery and reuse of the ionic liquid is generally considered important due to cost and sustainability considerations.

=== Batteries ===
ILs can replace water as the electrolyte in metal-air batteries. ILs are attractive because of their low vapor pressure. Furthermore, ILs have an electrochemical window of up to six volts (versus 1.23 for water) supporting more energy-dense metals. Energy densities from 900 to 1600 watt-hours per kilogram appear possible.

=== Dispersing agent ===
ILs can act as dispersing agents in paints to enhance finish, appearance, and drying properties. ILs are used for dispersing nanomaterials at IOLITEC.

=== Carbon capture ===
ILs and amines have been investigated for capturing carbon dioxide CO_{2} and purifying natural gas.

=== Tribology ===
Some ionic liquids have been shown to reduce friction and wear in basic tribological testing, and their polar nature makes them candidate lubricants for tribotronic applications. While the comparatively high cost of ionic liquids currently prevents their use as neat lubricants, adding ionic liquids in concentrations as low as 0.5 wt% may significantly alter the lubricating performance of conventional base oils. Thus, the current focus of research is on using ionic liquids as additives to lubricating oils, often with the motivation to replace widely used, ecologically harmful lubricant additives. However, the claimed ecological advantage of ionic liquids has been questioned repeatedly and is yet to be demonstrated from a life-cycle perspective.

== Safety ==
Ionic liquids' low volatility effectively eliminates a major pathway for environmental release and contamination.

Ionic liquids' aquatic toxicity is as severe as or more so than many current solvents.

Ultrasound can degrade solutions of imidazolium-based ionic liquids with hydrogen peroxide and acetic acid to relatively innocuous compounds.

Despite low vapor pressure many ionic liquids are combustible.

When Tawny crazy ants (Nylanderia fulva) combat fire ants (Solenopsis invicta), the latter spray them with a toxic, lipophilic, alkaloid-based venom. The Tawny crazy ant then exudes its own venom, formic acid, and self-grooms with it, an action which de-toxifies the fire ant venom. The mixed venoms chemically react with one another to form an ionic liquid, the first naturally occurring IL to be described.

== See also ==
- 1-Butyl-3-methylimidazolium hexafluorophosphate (BMIM-PF_{6}) for an often encountered ionic liquid
- Ionic liquids in carbon capture
- Ion gel
- Ioliomics, or studies of ions in liquids
- MDynaMix software for ionic liquids simulations
- Molten salt
- nanoFlowcell which uses ionic liquid in its car batteries
- Trioctylmethylammonium bis(trifluoromethylsulfonyl)imide
