= Touch memory =

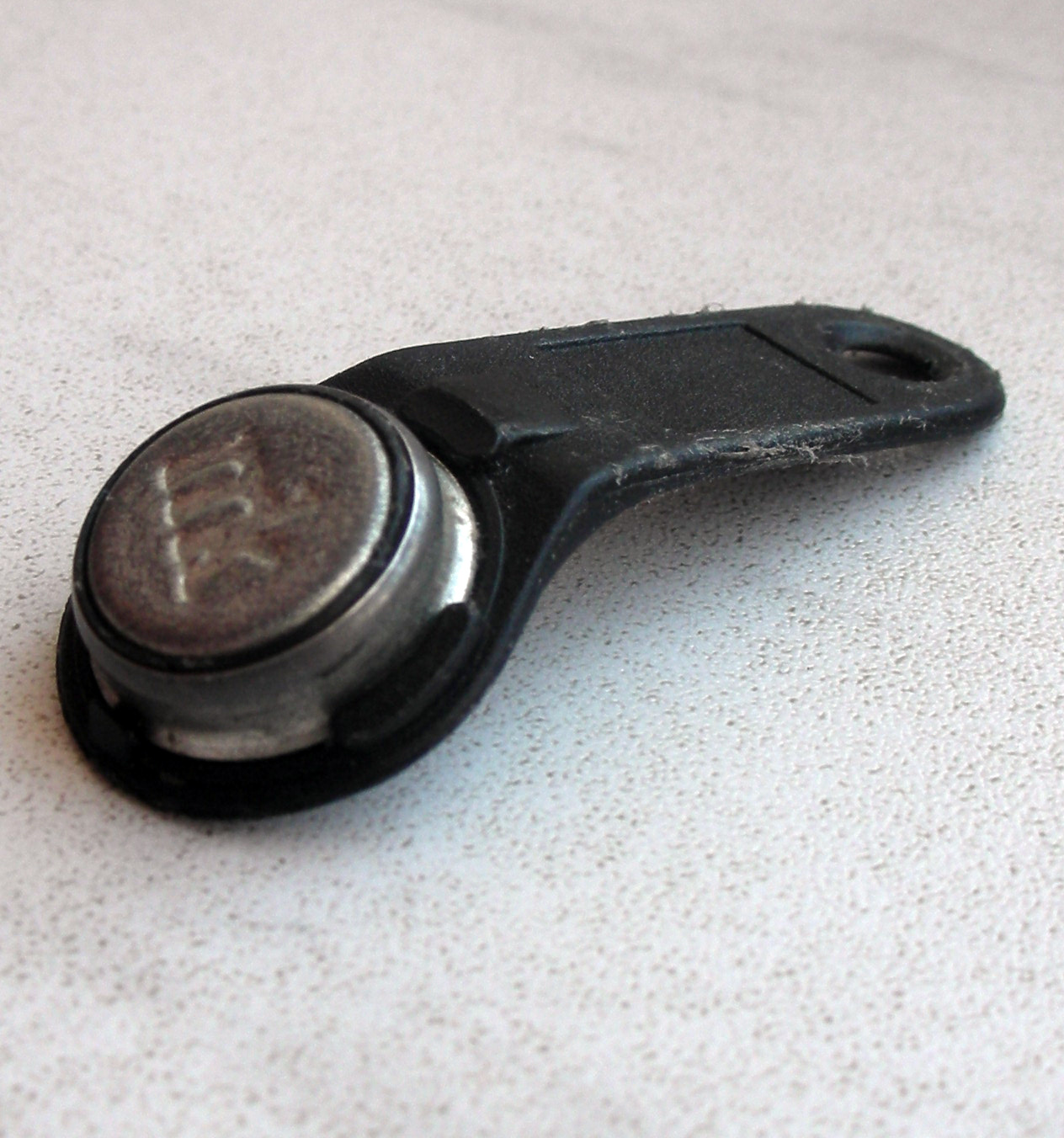
Doorphone key based on touch memory technology

Touch Memory (or contact memory) is an electronic identification device packaged in a coin-shaped stainless steel container. Touch memory is accessed when a touch probe comes into contact with a memory button.

Read and/or write operations between the probe and memory chip are performed with just a momentary contact. Thousands of reads and writes can be performed with a single chip and data integrity can last over 100 years.

Touch memory complements such technologies as bar codes, RFID tags, magnetic stripe, proximity cards and smart cards.

== Uses ==
Touch memory is used in such areas as

- Access control
- Asset management
- eCash
- Gaming systems
- Thermochron applications
- Time and attendance

== Examples ==
The US Postal Service uses touch memory for tracking collection times on its large collection boxes. Healthcare, transportation, and trade show organizations also use the technology.

== Advantages ==
Unlike bar codes and magnetic stripe cards, many touch memory solutions can be written to as well as being read. Communication rate, and product breadth, of touch memory goes well beyond the simple memory products typically available with RFID. The durability of the stainless-steel-clad touch memory is much greater than the thin plastic of a smart card.

== See also ==
- 1-Wire protocol
