= 1-Methylimidazole =

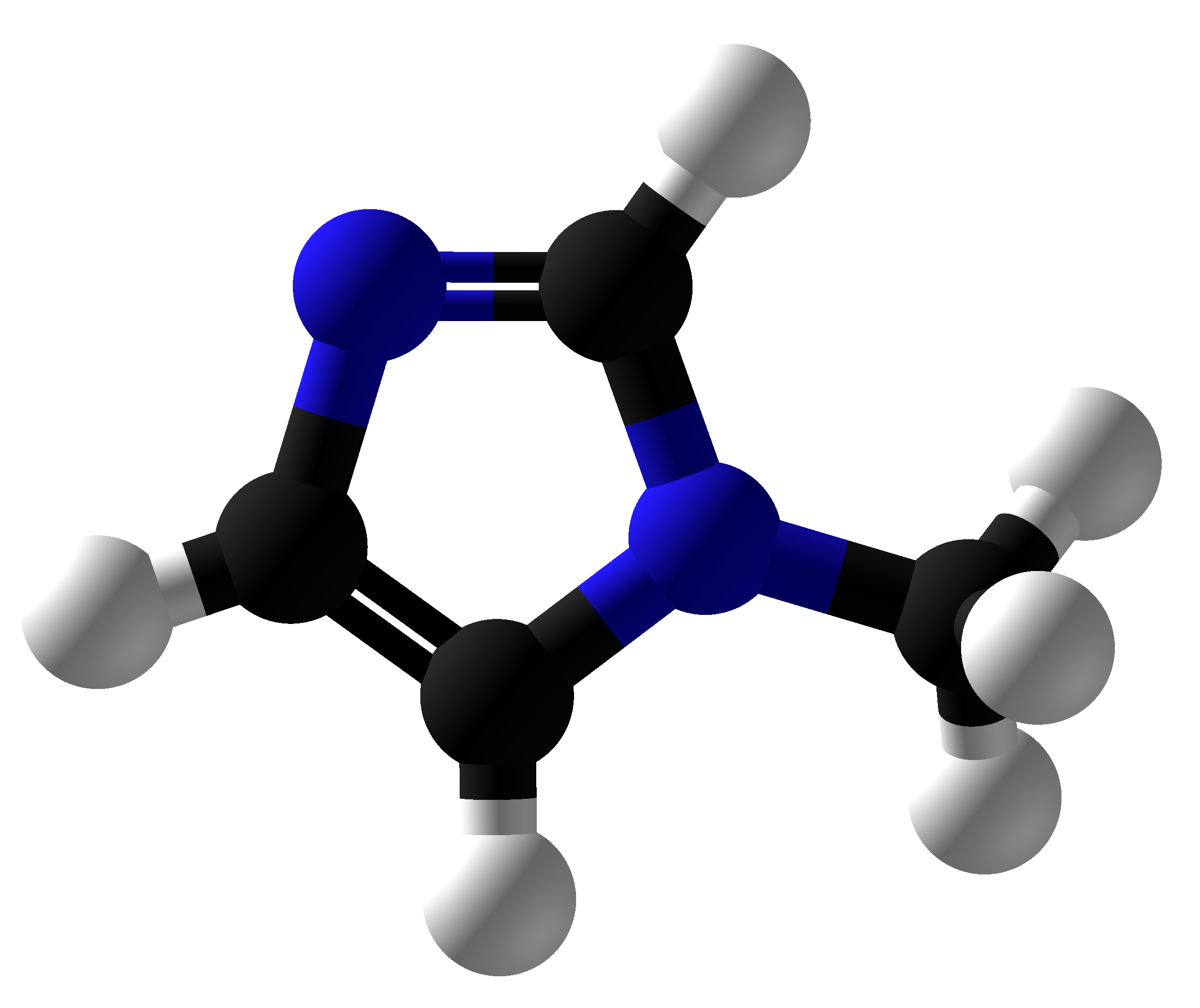

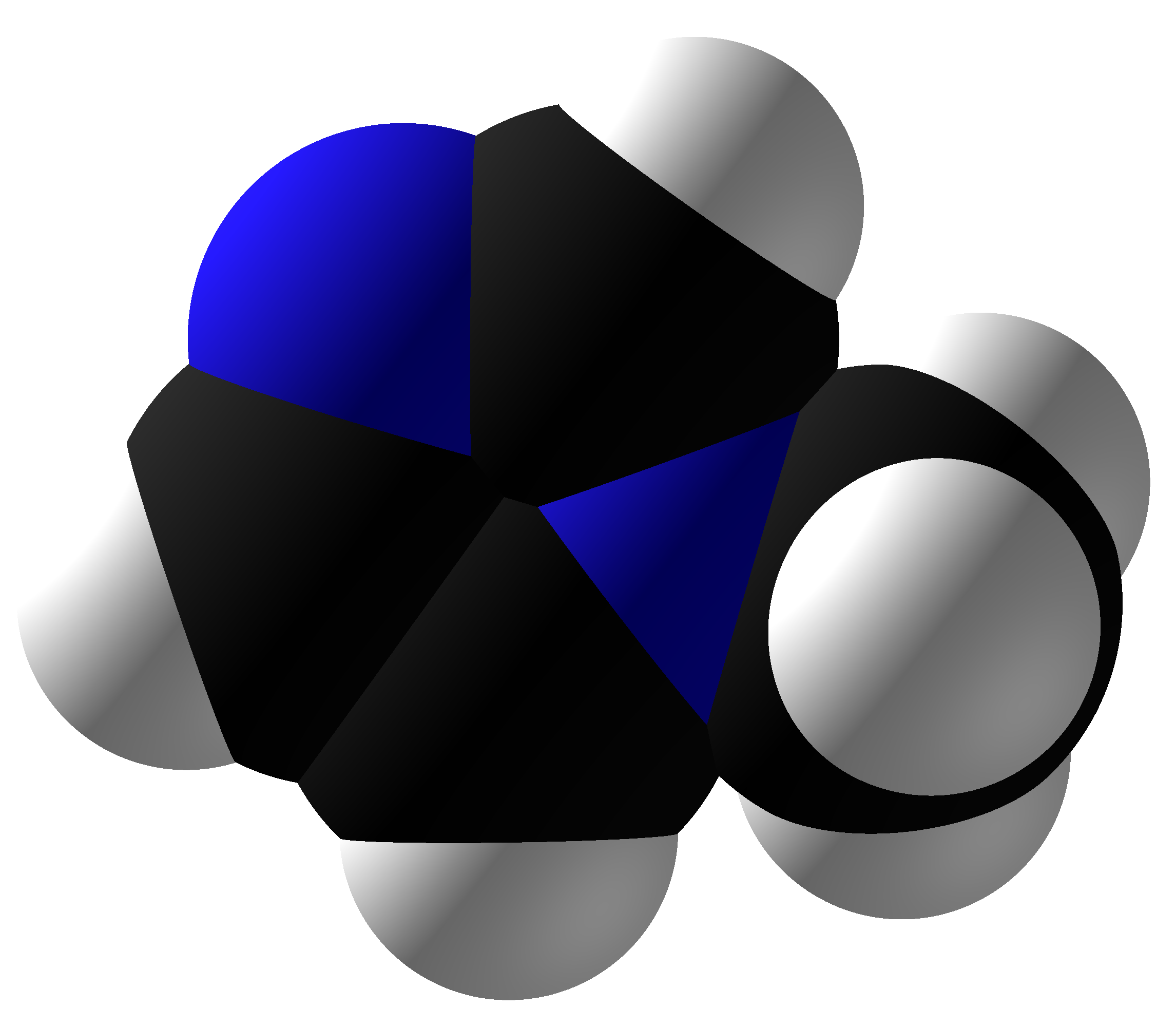

Names
- Preferred IUPAC name 1-Methyl-1H-imidazole
- Other names 1-Methylimidazole; N-Methylimidazole; NMI

Identifiers
| CAS Number | 616-47-7 |
| 3D model (JSmol) | Interactive image; Interactive image |
| Beilstein Reference | 105197 |
| ChEBI | CHEBI:113454 |
| ChEMBL | ChEMBL543 |
| ChemSpider | 1348 |
| DrugBank | DB02671 |
| ECHA InfoCard | 100.009.532 |
| EC Number | 210-484-7 |
| Gmelin Reference | 2403 |
| PubChem CID | 1390 |
| UNII | P4617QS63Y |
| CompTox Dashboard (EPA) | DTXSID6052291 |
- InChI: InChI=1S/C4H6N2/c1-6-3-2-5-4-6/h2-4H,1H3 Key: MCTWTZJPVLRJOU-UHFFFAOYSA-N; InChI=1/C4H6N2/c1-6-3-2-5-4-6/h2-4H,1H3 Key: MCTWTZJPVLRJOU-UHFFFAOYAU
- SMILES: n1ccn(c1)C; Cn1ccnc1

Properties
| Chemical formula | C_{4}H_{6}N_{2} |
| Molar mass | 82.10 g/mol |
| Density | 1.03 g/cm^{3} |
| Melting point | −6 °C (21 °F; 267 K) |
| Boiling point | 198 °C (388 °F; 471 K) |

Hazards
- GHS labelling
| Pictograms | (GHS05: Corrosive) (GHS07: Exclamation mark) |
| Signal word | Danger |
| Hazard statements | H302, H312, H314 |
| Precautionary statements | P260, P264, P270, P280, P301+P312, P301+P330+P331, P302+P352, P303+P361+P353, P304+P340, P305+P351+P338, P310, P312, P321, P322, P330, P363, P405, P501 |
| Safety data sheet (SDS) | Oxford MSDS |
- Except where otherwise noted, data are given for materials in their standard state (at 25 °C [77 °F], 100 kPa). verify (what is ?) Infobox references

1-Methylimidazole or N-methylimidazole is an aromatic heterocyclic organic compound with the formula CH_{3}C_{3}H_{3}N_{2}. It is a colourless liquid that is used as a specialty solvent, a base, and as a precursor to some ionic liquids. It is a fundamental nitrogen heterocycle and as such mimics for various nucleoside bases as well as histidine and histamine.

== Basicity ==
With the N-methyl group, this particular derivative of imidazole cannot tautomerize. It is slightly more basic than imidazole, as indicated by the pKa's of the conjugate acids of 7.0 and 7.4. Methylation also provides a significantly lower melting point, which makes 1-methylimidazole a useful solvent.

== Synthesis ==
1-Methylimidazole is prepared mainly by two routes industrially. The main one is acid-catalysed methylation of imidazole by methanol. The second method involves the Radziszewski reaction from glyoxal, formaldehyde, and a mixture of ammonia and methylamine.

(CHO)_{2} + CH_{2}O + CH_{3}NH_{2} + NH_{3} → H_{2}C_{2}N(NCH_{3})CH + 3 H_{2}O

The compound can be synthesized on a laboratory scale by methylation of imidazole at the pyridine-like nitrogen and subsequent deprotonation. Similarly, 1-methylimidazole may be synthesized by first deprotonating imidazole to form a sodium salt followed by methylation.

H_{2}C_{2}N(NH)CH + CH_{3}I → [H_{2}C_{2}(NH)(NCH_{3})CH]I
[H_{2}C_{2}(NH)(NCH_{3})CH]I + NaOH → H_{2}C_{2}N(NCH_{3})CH + H_{2}O + NaI

== Applications ==
In the research laboratory, 1-methylimidazole and related derivatives have been used as mimic aspects of diverse imidazole-based biomolecules.

1-Methylimidazole is also the precursor for the synthesis of the methylimidazole monomer of pyrrole-imidazole polyamides. These polymers can selectively bind specific sequences of double-stranded DNA by intercalating in a sequence dependent manner.

=== Ionic liquid precursor ===
1-Methylimidazole alkylates to form dialkyl imidazolium salts. Depending on the alkylating agent and the counteranion, various ionic liquids result, e.g. 1-butyl-3-methylimidazolium hexafluorophosphate ("BMIMPF_{6}"):

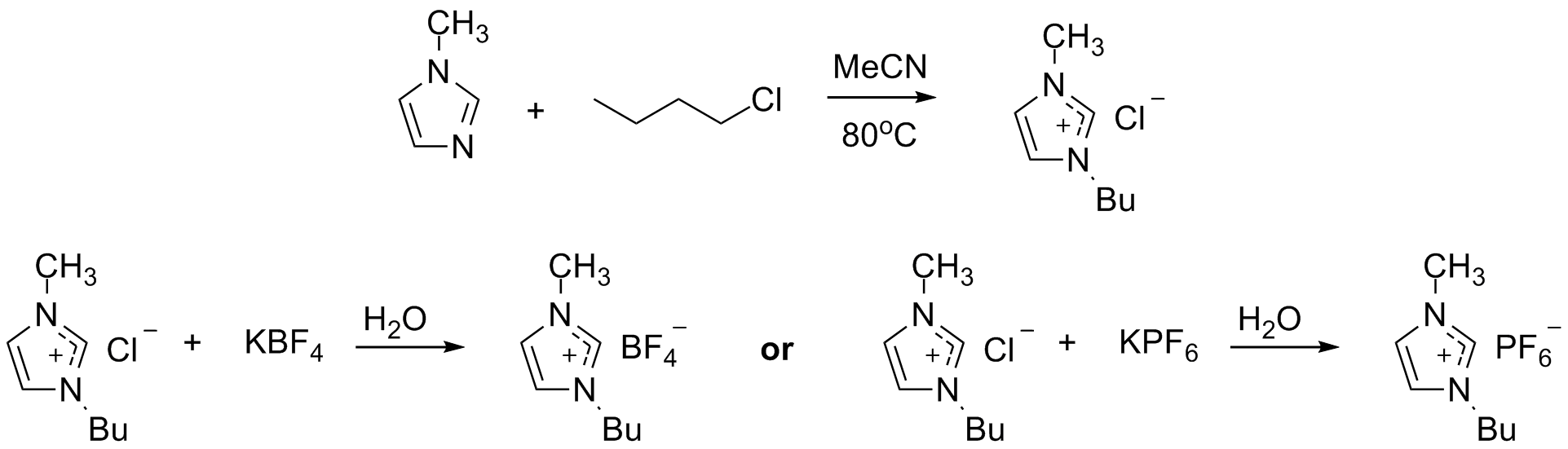

BASF has used 1-methylimidazole as a means to remove acid during their industrial-scale production of diethoxyphenylphosphine. In this biphasic acid scavenging using ionic liquids (BASIL) process, 1-methylimidazole reacts with HCl to produce 1-methylimidazolium hydrochloride, which spontaneously separates as a separate liquid phase under the reaction conditions.

2 MeC_{3}N_{2}H_{3} + C_{6}H_{5}PCl_{2} + 2 C_{2}H_{5}OH → 2 [MeC_{3}N_{2}H_{4}]Cl + C_{6}H_{5}P(OC_{2}H_{5})_{2}

=== Donor properties ===
1-methylimidazole (NMIz) as a ligand forms octahedral ions M(NMIz)_{6}^{2+}with M = Fe, Co, Ni, and a square-planar ion Cu(NMIz)_{4}^{2+}. 1-methylimidazole forms adducts with Lewis acids such as molybdenum perfluorobutyrate and [Rh(CO)_{2}Cl]_{2}. The donor properties of 1-methylimidazole have been analyzed by the ECW model yielding E_{B}= 1.16 and C_{B}= 4.92.

== See also ==
- 4-Methylimidazole
