= R8C Tiny =

R8C/Tiny is a series of low-cost microcontrollers from Renesas. They have a 16-bit MCU with 16KB of flash memory and 1KB of RAM. The chip includes peripherals such as a timer, an A/D, and a USART. These microcontrollers have applications in building automation, industrial control, power tools, security systems, and home appliances. The series is obsolete as of February 5, 2025, and Renesas recommends that their newer products are used instead.
