= AKPM =

AKPM or akpm may refer to:

- Alaska Public Media, an American television and radio public broadcaster
- Andrew Morton (computer programmer), an Australian software engineer who goes by the user name akpm
