= Andrew Morton (computer programmer) =

Australian software engineer (born 1959)

Andrew Keith Paul Morton
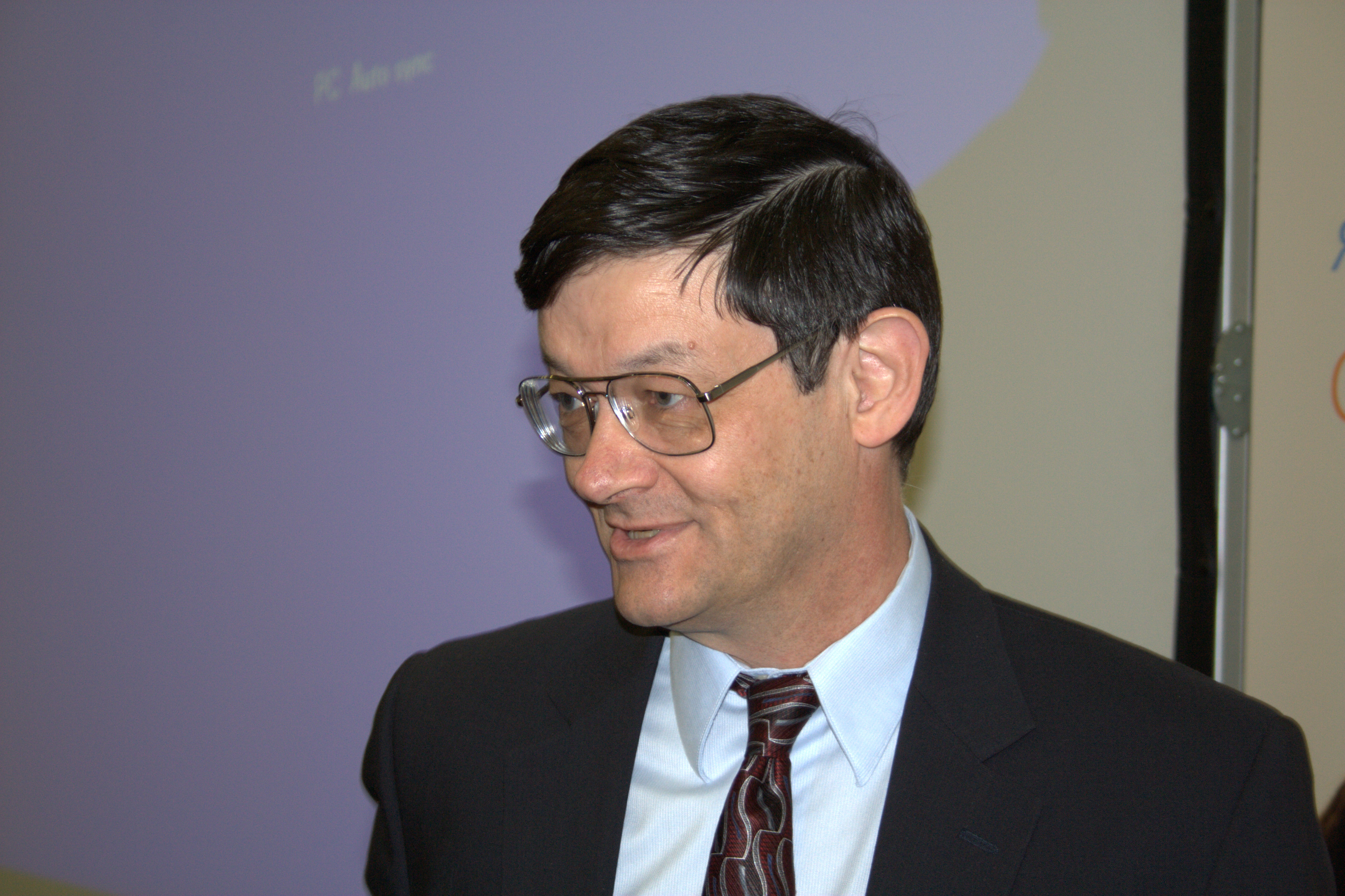
- Andrew Morton speaking at Interop, Moscow, 2008
- Born: July 15, 1959 (age 66); England
- Other names: akpm
- Education: Electrical engineering
- Occupation: Programmer
- Employer: Google
- Known for: -mm tree
- Spouse: Kathryn Morton
- Children: Victoria Morton, Michael Morton, Matthew Morton
- Parent: Prof. David Morton (deceased)

Andrew Keith Paul Morton (born 1959) is an Australian software engineer. He is one of the lead developers of the Linux kernel, and a co-maintainer of the Ext3 file system, the journaling layer for block devices (JBD) and memory management.

== Biography ==
In the late 1980s, he was one of the partners of a company in Sydney, Australia that produced a kit computer called the Applix 1616, as well as a hardware engineer for the now-defunct Australian gaming equipment manufacturer Keno Computer Systems. He holds an honours degree in electrical engineering from the University of New South Wales in Australia.

Morton maintains a Linux kernel patchset known as the mm tree, which contains work-in-progress patches that might later be accepted into the official Linux tree maintained by Linus Torvalds. "mm" as a primary testing ground became unmanageably large and busy, and in 2008 the "linux-next" tree was created to fill much of this role.

In 2001, Morton and his family moved from Wollongong, New South Wales to Palo Alto, California. In July 2003, he joined the Open Source Development Labs under an agreement with his then-employer Digeo Inc. (makers of the Moxi home entertainment media center), in which OSDL supported Morton's Linux kernel development work while he continued in his official role as principal engineer at Digeo.

Since August 2006, Morton has been employed by Google and continues his current work in maintaining the kernel.

Morton delivered the keynote speech at the 2004 Ottawa Linux Symposium. He was also a featured speaker at MontaVista Software's Vision 2007 Conference. He was an expert witness in the SCO v. IBM lawsuit contesting UNIX copyrights.

Morton is also known by his username akpm, as found in e-mail addresses and as part of the URL to his now-defunct webpage. On being asked what the initials KP stood for, he replied, "Some say 'Kernel Programmer.' My parents said 'Keith Paul.'"
