= Speedwire =

Prototyping system

Speedwire is a solderless prototyping system manufactured by BICC-Vero for constructing electronic circuit boards. The system is based on a circuit board pre-drilled with holes in a regular 0.1-inch (2.54 mm) square grid. The boards are available in standard sizes such as Eurocard modules. Some of the holes are through-plated and interconnected with copper strips to form power and ground rails.

Special terminals are provided, which are inserted, using a special tool, into the holes in the prototyping board where components are to be fitted. Some boards are also available pre-populated with terminals. Each terminal is a metal tube with a component socket at one end and an insulation-displacement fork at the other. The component socket accepts a wire lead, such as the lead of a resistor or capacitor, or the leg of a 0.1-inch-pitch DIL package. The insulation-displacement fork accepts an insulated wire specially manufactured for the Speedwire system. The wire is pressed between the forks using a special tool. The forks cut through the insulation and grip the wire, making a gas-tight contact. The wire can then be cut off, or continued to another terminal. Wires can be pulled out of terminals and re-routed.
