= Intel 8251 =

Universal asynchronous receiver/transmitter made by intel

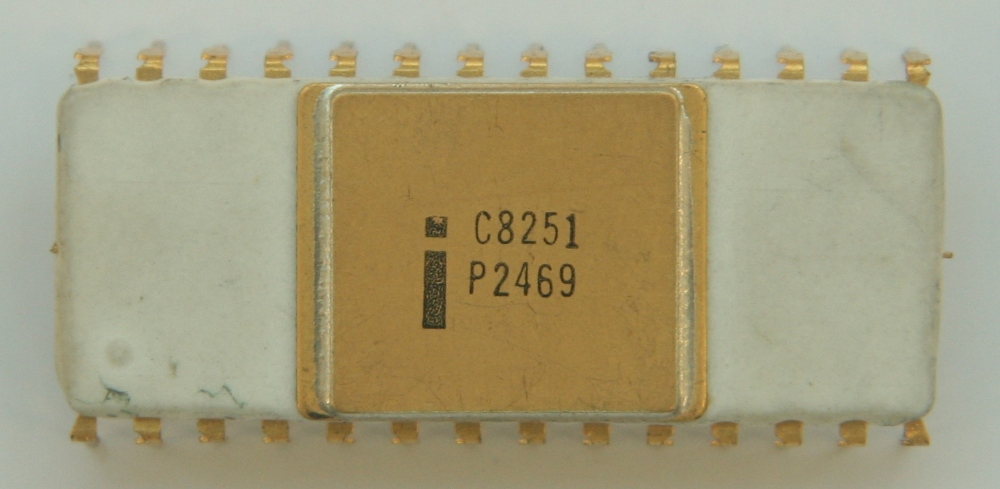
Intel C8251

The 8251 is a Universal Synchronous/Asynchronous Receiver/Transmitter (USART) packaged in a 28-pin DIP made by Intel. It is typically used for serial communication and was rated for 19.2 kilobits per second signalling rate.

It is commonly confused with the much more common 8250 UART that was made popular as the serial port in the IBM Personal Computer.

It includes 5 sections:

1. read/write control logic
2. transmitter
3. receiver
4. data bus system
5. modem control

== Variants ==
Model Number	Temperature Range	Date of Release	Price (USD) (Note: In quantities of 100 and up)
ID8251	Industrial	March/April 1979	$25.10
8251A	Commercial	May/June 1980	$6.40

== Known uses ==
The Intel 8251A was used in the Intel SDK-86 MCS-86 System Design Kit and the DEC LA120 printing terminal. The device is also used in the IC-10 RS-232 interface kit used in Kenwood amateur radios like the TS-440S, TS-711, TS-811 and many others.

== External links and references ==
- Mikrocomputer Bausteine, Datenbuch 1979/80, Band 3, Peripherie, Siemens AG, Bestellnummer B 2049, pp. 64–101.
- NEC Electronics (Europe) GmbH, 1982 Catalog, pp. 631–648
- Intel Corporation, "8251 Programmable Communication Interface", Intel 8080 Microcomputer Systems User's Manual, September 1975, page 5-135 from bitsaver.org in PDF
