= Transmitarray antenna =

Planar transmitarray fed by a horn antenna. Structure showing unit cells.

A transmitarray antenna (or just transmitarray or called as layered lens antenna) is a phase-shifting surface (PSS), a structure capable of focusing electromagnetic radiation from a source antenna to produce a high-gain beam. Transmitarrays consist of an array of unit cells placed above a source (feeding) antenna. Phase shifts are applied to the unit cells, between elements on the receive and transmit surfaces, to focus the incident wavefronts from the feeding antenna. These thin surfaces can be used instead of a dielectric lens. Unlike phased arrays, transmitarrays do not require a feed network, so losses can be greatly reduced. Similarly, they have an advantage over reflectarrays in that feed blockage is avoided.

It is worth clarifying that transmitarrays can be used in both transmit and receive modes: the waves are transmitted through the structure in either direction. An important parameter in transmitarray design is the $F/D$ ratio, which determines the aperture efficiency. $F$ is the focal length and $D$ is the diameter of the transmitarray. The projected area of the feeding antenna determines the illumination efficiency of a transmitarray panel. Provided that the insertion loss of each unit cell is minimised, an aperture area appropriate to the feed radiation pattern can efficiently focus the wavefronts from the feed.

== Overview of techniques ==
Transmitarrays can be split into two types: fixed and reconfigurable. As described earlier, a transmitarray is a phase-shifting surface consisting of an array of unit cells. These focus the wavefronts from a feeding antenna into a narrower beamwidth. By applying a progressive phase shift across the aperture of the transmitarray, the beam can be focused and steered towards a direction away from boresight (0° angles).

=== Fixed transmitarrays ===
Ey-field component at a cross-section through a planar transmitarray consisting of double-square loop unit cells. The curvature of the outgoing wavefronts is reduced (the directivity is increased) compared to the incident wavefronts.

First, consider fixed transmitarrays. At each location on the surface of the structure, the unit cells are physically scaled or rotated in order to obtain the required amplitude and phase distribution. Thus, only one focusing direction is available. The aim is to approximate the ideal phase distribution, such as $\Delta \phi(x,y) = \frac{-2\pi}{\lambda_{0}}\sqrt{x^2 + y^2 + F^2}$ for a feed located at $(0,0,-F)$, which can be achieved by discretising the surface of the transmitarray into several Fresnel zones. High aperture efficiency (55%) can be achieved at oblique angles of incidence using precision-machined double split ring slot unit cells. A switched-beam transmitarray covering the 57 – 66 GHz band has been reported. Three different types of unit cells were used, based on patches and coupling slots. Similarly, a 60 GHz design used unit cells with a 2-bit phase resolution and selected an optimal $F/D$ ratio to widen the bandwidth. When $F/D$ = 0.5, a scan loss of 2.2 dB was achieved at a 30° steering angle.

Different types of unit cells have been used within the same transmitarray. In, slot elements were placed near the centre of the transmitarray, as their polarisation performance is better at normal incidence, whereas double square ring slot elements were used at the edges, as they perform better at oblique incidence angles. This enabled the subtended (flare) angle of the feed horn to be increased, and hence the length of the horn, and the overall antenna size, to be reduced. Unit cells were not required at the centre of the transmitarray, where the phase shift was 0°. This reduced the insertion loss to around 1 dB at 105 GHz, as the majority of the beam amplitude was in the central region. In a different design, substrate integrated waveguide (SIW) aperture coupling was employed to reduce insertion losses and widen the bandwidth of a transmitarray operating at 140 GHz. Due to the large number of vias required, this performance improvement was at the expense of a more complex and costly fabrication.

It has been shown that transmitarray implementation can be divided into two approaches: layered-scatterer and guided-wave. The first approach uses multiple coupled layers to achieve a phase shift, but has poor sidelobe level (SLL) performance when steering due to higher-order Floquet modes. The second approach enables wider steering, at the expense of increased hardware cost and complexity.

=== Reconfiguration methods ===
In a reconfigurable transmitarray, the focusing direction is determined by electronically controlling the phase shift through each unit cell. This enables the beam to be steered towards the user. Electronic reconfiguration can be achieved by several possible methods.

Radiation pattern for a planar transmitarray.

PIN diodes can be used to enable fast phase reconfiguration with an insertion loss below 1 dB. However, a large number of components is typically required, which increases the cost. A reconfigurable transmitarray, operating at 29 GHz with circular polarisation, has been demonstrated as a beamformer. A boresight gain of 20.8 dBi was achieved, and the scan loss was 2.5 dB at 40°. Another implementation example is an active Fresnel reflectarray with control circuitry for the PIN diodes. Although the unit cells were optimised, the scan loss was 3.4 dB at 30°. Reconfigurable near-field focusing can be implemented using slots containing PIN diodes. By adjusting the phase compared to a reference wave, holographic principles enabled the use of a compact, planar feeding structure and suppression of undesired lobes. This was extended in to an implementation of a Mills cross based on PIN diodes, in which an aperture was synthesised for imaging applications. Radial stubs were used to isolate the bias lines from the RF. By switching combinations of meta-elements on or off, the scan loss was 0 dB for steering angles of ±30°, but the total efficiency was only 35%.

In 2019, a transmitarray was fed by a planar phased array operating at 10 GHz, in order to achieve a high beam crossover gain level whilst maintaining an aperture efficiency of 57.5%. The scan loss was 3.13 dB at ±30°. Similarly, a lens-enhanced phased array antenna, similar to a transmitarray, has been demonstrated. By combining the beam steering capabilities of phased arrays and the focusing properties of transmitarrays, this hybrid antenna has a smaller form factor, and steers to ±45° in both planes with a 3.2 dB increase in directivity at this angle. Its reconfigurable phase-shifting surface (PSS) contained micro-electro-mechanical (MEMS) switches to change the length of resonators, sandwiched within an antenna-filter-antenna structure. The PSS created the optimal 2D phase distribution needed to achieve high-gain beam focusing, but the MEMS fabrication process was complex and costly, requiring a large number of control lines. MEMS and other mechanical switching methods can achieve a relatively low insertion loss (2.5 dB) and an excellent linearity, but are prone to stiction and reliability issues

Reconfigurable materials have shown promise for enabling a low-loss beam steering transmitarray. A vanadium dioxide reconfigurable metasurface operating at 100 GHz was presented in using a crossed-slot unit cell. A heating element was used to thermally control the phase shift through each cell. The permittivity of liquid crystal (and hence the phase shift) can be reconfigured by applying a voltage between two parallel conducting plates. However, liquid crystal has several practical challenges. The liquid must be hermetically sealed in a cavity, and the crystal orientations aligned with the cavity walls in an unbiased state. The liquid can flow between cells, causing a variation in the RF properties of the transmitarray, and dynamic instabilities. Liquid crystal reflectarrays have been extensively investigated at 78 GHz and 100 GHz. In, a fishnet metamaterial lens was designed, using liquid crystal to achieve a 360° electronically controlled phase range. The 5 dB unit cell insertion loss could be reduced by controlling the Bloch impedance (both $\epsilon_{r}$ and $\mu_{r}$) of each unit cell. The advantage of liquid crystal is that its loss tangent reduces with frequency, however it suffers from a slow switching time of around 100 ms and fabrication difficulties.

== Geometry and radiation pattern ==
Coordinate system for a planar transmitarray fed by a horn antenna.

A conventional transmitarray consists of a planar arrangement of unit cells, illuminated by a feed source. For this structure, the required phase distribution is: $\phi_{m}(x_{m}, y_{m}, z_{m}) = -k_{0}(\sin{\theta_{0}}\cos{\phi_{0}}x_{m} + \sin{\theta_{0}}\sin{\phi_{0}}y_{m} + \cos{\theta_{0}}z_{m})$

where ($\theta_{0}$, $\phi_{0}$) are the elevation and azimuth steering directions, and $(x_{m}, y_{m}, z_{m})$ are the coordinates of unit cell $m$. Note that $x_{m} = \left(m + \frac{M-1}{2}\right)d$, $y_{n} = \left(n + \frac{N-1}{2}\right)d$, and $z_{m} = 0$. $M$ and $N$ are the total numbers of unit cells in the $x$- and $y$-directions respectively.

When steering in azimuth only, this simplifies to: $\phi_{m}(x_{m}, y_{m}) = k_{0}(d_{m} - \sin{\theta_{0}}(x_{m}\cos{\phi_{0}} + y_{m}\sin{\phi_{0}}))$

where $d_{m} = \sqrt{(x_{m} - x_{f})^2 + (y_{m} - y_{f})^2 + z_{f})^2}$

and ($x_{f}$,$y_{f}$,$z_{f}$) are the coordinates of the feed, in this case (0,0,-$F$).

The overall radiation pattern can be calculated, using. Here, terms are combined to express the formula in full: $E(\theta, \phi) = \sum_{m=1}^{M} \sum_{n=1}^{N} \cos^{q_{e}}\left({\theta - \theta_{0}}\right) \frac{\cos^{q_{f}}\left({\theta_{f mn}}\right)}{\sqrt{(md)^2 + (nd)^2 + F^2}}|T_{mn}| e^{j \Psi_{mn}}\times e^{-jk\left(\sqrt{(md)^2 + (nd)^2 + F^2} - d(m\sin{\theta}\cos{\phi} + n\sin{\theta}\sin{\phi})\right)}$

where the radiation pattern of the steered array source is modelled as $\cos^{q_{e}}\left({\theta - \theta_{0}}\right)$. The term $e^{j \Psi_{mn}}$ corresponds to the phases applied to the transmitarray unit cells, to undo the phase variation due to the geometry of the cells from the feed, i.e. $e^{j \Psi_{mn}}e^{-jk \angle G_{mn}} = 1$.

=== Edge taper and aperture efficiency ===
$G_{\textrm{edge}} = 10\log_{10}\left(\cos^{n}{\theta_{sub}}\right)$ An edge taper of around -10 dB is desired, so that the illumination efficiency is maximised.

For a planar (conventional) transmitarray, fed by an antenna with radiation pattern $G_{f}(\theta,\phi) = \cos^{n}{\theta}$, and subtended angle $\theta_{sub} = \tan^{-1}\left({\frac{D}{2F}}\right)$, the taper efficiency is calculated by: $\eta_{s} = 1 - \cos^{n+1}{\theta_{sub}}$ $\eta_{t} = \frac{2n}{\tan^2{\theta_{sub}}} \frac{(1 - \cos^{(n/2) - 1}{\theta_{sub}})^2}{(\frac{n}{2} - 1)^2 (1 - \cos^{n}{\theta_{sub}})}$

$\theta_{sub}$ is a function of $F/D$. Note that $\cos(\tan^{-1}{x}) = \frac{1}{\sqrt{1+x^2}}$, so using $x = \frac{D}{2F}$, this formula can be expressed in terms of $F/D$, rather than the subtended angle. The illumination efficiency is the product of these: $\eta_{i} = \eta_{s}\eta_{t}$. The overall aperture efficiency $\eta_{ap}$ is obtained by multiplying by material losses and any directivity reduction terms.

== Unit cell design ==
A variety of unit cell shapes have been proposed, including double square loops, U-shaped resonators, microstrip patches, and slots. The double square loop has the best transmission performance at wide angles of incidence, whereas a large bandwidth can be achieved if Jerusalem cross slots are used. A switchable FSS using MEMS capacitors was demonstrated in. The four-legged loaded element was used to obtain full control of the bandwidth and incidence angle properties. For space applications, in which thermal expansion must be considered, air gaps between layers can be used instead of dielectric, to minimise the insertion loss (metal-only transmitarray). However, this increases the thickness, and requires a large number of screws for mechanical support.

=== Design example ===
Jerusalem cross slot 2-layer unit cell (OFF state, 0° phase shift).

Crossed slot 2-layer unit cell (ON state, 180° phase shift).

Crossed slot 2-layer unit cell: side view showing dielectric and conductor layers.

Transmission magnitude through the unit cell for each state.

Transmission phase through the unit cell for each state.

Consider the structure of the proposed 1-bit unit cell, which operates at 28 GHz. It is based on the design presented in. It consists of two metal layers, printed on a Rogers RT5880 substrate material having a thickness of 0.254 mm, a dielectric constant of 2.2, and a loss tangent of 0.0009. Each metal layer consists of a pair of crossed slots, and the incident fields are vertically polarised ($E_{y}$). By selecting a symmetrical unit cell shape, they can be adapted for dual linear or circular polarisation. The two metal layers are separated by a 3 mm thick layer of ePTFE material (of dielectric constant $\epsilon_{r}$ = 1.4), which creates a 100° phase shift between these layers. The unit cell has reduced thickness and insertion loss compared with multilayer designs.

The unit cell can be reconfigured between two phase states, OFF (0°) and ON (180°). For the OFF state, it has a Jerusalem cross slot structure. In the ON state, the slots are not loaded with Jerusalem cross (JC) shaped caps, producing a large phase change. Due to the use of single-pole resonators (a two-layer structure), the transmission performance was challenging to achieve, requiring fine-tuning of the unit cell physical dimensions.

Both unit cell states were simulated in CST Microwave Studio using Floquet ports and the frequency domain solver. This included the magnitude and phase of the $E_{y}$ transmission coefficient through the unit cell in ON and OFF states. A phase change of 189° was observed, which is close to 180°, and the transmission magnitude is at least -1.76 dB at 28 GHz for both states. For the JC cells, the surface currents are in opposite directions (anti-phase) on each conductor layers, whereas for the CS cells, the surface currents are in the same direction (in-phase).

The phase difference between states is given by: $\Delta\phi = \angle{S_{21}}_{\textrm{OFF}} -\angle{S_{21}}_{\textrm{ON}}$.

=== Biasing reconfigurable unit cells ===
PIN diodes can be placed across the ends of the Jerusalem cross caps, applying a different bias voltage for each state. DC blocking in the form of interdigital capacitors would be needed to isolate the bias voltages, and RF choke inductors would be needed at the ends of the bias lines. To demonstrate the transmitarray concept, unit cells with fixed phase shifts were used in the fabricated prototypes. For electronic reconfiguration, PIN diodes would need to be placed on both the top and bottom layers. When the diodes are forward biased (ON), incident radiation is transmitted through the slots with a 180° phase change, but when the diodes are reverse biased (OFF), the current path is lengthened so that there is minimal phase change (around 0°).

The MACOM MA4GP907 diode has an ON resistance $R_{\textrm{ON}}$ = 4.2 $\Omega$, an OFF resistance $R_{\textrm{OFF}}$ = 300 k$\Omega$, and small parasitic inductance and capacitance values ($L_{\textrm{ON}}$ = 0.05 nH, $C_{\textrm{OFF}}$ = 42 fF in the 28 GHz band). Given that it has a high OFF resistance value, and that the switching time is very fast (2 ns), this component is suitable for the design.

The position and orientation of the bias lines must be chosen to minimise their effect on the transmission of the incident waves through the structure. If the lines are sufficiently narrow (width up to 0.1 mm), they will present a high impedance, so will have less effect on the wavefronts. As they act as a polarising grid, the bias lines should be perpendicular to the incident field direction. This design has no ground plane, so each group of active unit cells must have both a $V_{\textrm{bias}}$ and a ground connection. As groups of cells share the same bias voltages, these lines can be routed between adjacent cells. The required number of external control lines is equal to the number of beam directions supported, so is inversely proportional to the steering resolution.

The bias lines could be implemented as large blocks of copper around the unit cells, separated by thin gaps (through which the RF wave propagation is heavily attenuated). The gaps may need to be meandered to form DC block capacitors. Radial stubs or high-impedance lines of length $\frac{\lambda_{g}}{4}$ (a quarter of a guided wavelength) could be used as chokes (inductors) on the external control lines, to prevent the RF signal from affecting the DC control circuitry.

== Discussion ==
A key challenge in transmitarray design is that the insertion loss increases with the number of conductor layers within the unit cell. In, it was shown that the optimal number of layers to maximise the gain (directivity vs. loss) is 3 layers. This has been corroborated by an analysis of cascaded sheet admittances. However, for scenarios when cost and efficiency are more important, a low-cost two-layer transmitarray may be preferred. Alternatively, the efficiency can be improved by integrating the antenna used to feed the transmitarray within a monolithic chip, as recently demonstrated in the D-band frequency range (114 – 144 GHz). Another high-gain transmitarray was demonstrated, operating at D-band (110 – 170 GHz). The $F/D$ was optimised to maximise the aperture efficiency. The antenna was connected to an integrated frequency multiplier to demonstrate a communication link. A data rate of 1 Gbit/s was achieved over a distance of 2.5 m, with an error vector magnitude (EVM) of 25%

== See also ==
- Phased array
- Metamaterial
- Dielectric Lens
- Millimeter Wave
- Beamforming
- Reflectarray Antenna
