= Reflectarray antenna =

Beam focusing, typically horn-fed planar array of unit cells

Planar reflectarray fed by a horn antenna. Structure showing unit cells. This antenna has fixed cell delays, configured by different cutout sizes in each cell, as can be seen in the top-right inset. Larger cutouts produce the dark rings visible in the overview.

A reflectarray antenna (or just reflectarray) consists of an array of unit cells, illuminated by a feeding antenna (source of electromagnetic waves). The feeding antenna is usually a horn. The unit cells are usually backed by a ground plane, and the incident wave reflects off them towards the direction of the beam, but each cell adds a different phase delay to the reflected signal. A phase distribution of concentric rings is applied to focus the wavefronts from the feeding antenna into a plane wave (to account for the varying path lengths from the feeding antenna to each unit cell). A progressive phase shift can be applied to the unit cells to steer the beam direction. It is common to offset the feeding antenna to prevent blockage of the beam. In this case, the phase distribution on the reflectarray surface needs to be altered. A reflectarray focuses a beam in a similar way to a parabolic reflector (dish), but with a much thinner form factor.

== Phase distribution ==
According to, in a reflectarray a constant phase of the entire reflected field is achieved in a plane normal to the direction of the desired pencil beam as expressed by: $\frac{2\pi}{\lambda_0} \left(r_{mn} - R_{mn}.r\right) - \Delta \phi_{mn} = 2 \pi N$

where $\lambda_0$ is free space wavelength,

$r_{mn}$ is the position vector of the ${mn}$th element/unit cell relative to $(0,0,F)$,

$F$ is the focal length,

$R_{mn}$ is the position vector of ${mn}$th element relative to the origin $(0,0,0)$ i.e. centre of the reflectarray,

$r$ is the direction vector of the desired pencil beam,

$N = 1,2,3,...$,

and $\Delta \phi_{mn}$ is the phase shift introduced by ${mn}$th unit cell of reflect array to its reflected field relative to the incident field.

For a feed horn located at $(0,0,F)$, the formula for the optimal phase distribution on a conventional reflectarray for a beam in the boresight direction is given by:

$\Delta \phi(x_m, y_m) = \frac{2\pi}{\lambda_0}\sqrt{x^2 + y^2 + F^2}$

where $\Delta \phi(x_m, y_m)$ is the phase shift for a unit cell located at coordinates $(x_m, y_m)$.

Simulated and measured radiation patterns of a reflectarray antenna operating at 12.5 GHz.

== Unit cell considerations ==
It is important to analyse the reflection magnitude $|S_{11}|$ and the reflection phase $\angle S_{11}$ across the frequency bandwidth of operation. When designing a reflectarray, we aim to maximise the reflection magnitude $|S_{11}|$ to be close to 1 (0 dB). The reflection phase $\angle S_{11}$ at each unit cell determines the overall beam shape and direction. Ideally, the total phase shift range would be 360°. The aperture efficiency, and hence gain, of the reflectarray will be reduced if the angle of incidence to the unit cells is not considered, or if spillover occurs or illumination of the reflectarray is not optimal (see also transmitarrays). Similarly, phase errors due to quantization into a discrete number of phase states for digital control can also reduce the gain.

A fixed reflectarray has a single beam direction per feed. Changing the shape of the unit cells alters their reflection phase. The unit cells cannot be reconfigured. This has applications in point-to-point communications, or for a satellite covering a specific geographic region (with a fixed beam contour). A reconfigurable reflectarray has unit cells whose phase can be electronically controlled in real-time to steer the beam or change its shape. Several methods have been used to implement reconfigurable reflectarray unit cells, including PIN diodes, liquid crystal, and novel materials. Each of these methods introduces loss which reduces the efficiency of the unit cells. Linearity (such as distortion due to the diodes) also needs to be considered to minimise out-of-band radiation which could interfere with users on adjacent frequencies.

== Other types of reflectarrays ==
In satellite communications, it is necessary to produce multiple beams per feed, sometimes operating at different frequencies and polarizations. An example of this is the four-color frequency reuse scheme. Circular polarization is commonly used to reduce the effect of atmospheric depolarization on the communication system performance. A dual-band reflectarray has two different passband frequencies, for example for uplink and downlink. A bifocal reflectarray has two principle foci, so can focus wavefronts to or from two feeding antennas simultaneously. A dual reflectarray consists of two stages of reflection, in which the beam is first focused by one reflectarray, then by another. The phase distribution on each reflectarray must be carefully calculated to ensure that the phase derivatives are consistent with the angle of incidence of the rays The ratio of the sizes and positions of these reflectarrays can be used to achieve quasi-optical magnification (narrowing of the beam).

== See also ==
- Phased array
- Metamaterial
- Transmitarray Antenna
- Millimeter Wave
- Beamforming
