= Friis transmission equation =

Formula in telecommunications engineering of antenna performance

The Friis transmission formula is used in telecommunications engineering, equating the power at the terminals of a receive antenna as the product of power density of the incident wave and the effective aperture of the receiving antenna under idealized conditions given another antenna some distance away transmitting a known amount of power. The formula was presented first by Danish-American radio engineer Harald T. Friis in 1946. The formula is sometimes referenced as the Friis transmission equation.

== Friis' original formula ==
Friis' original idea behind his transmission formula was to dispense with the usage of directivity or gain when describing antenna performance. In their place is the descriptor of antenna aperture area as one of two important parts of the transmission formula that characterizes the behavior of a free-space radio circuit.

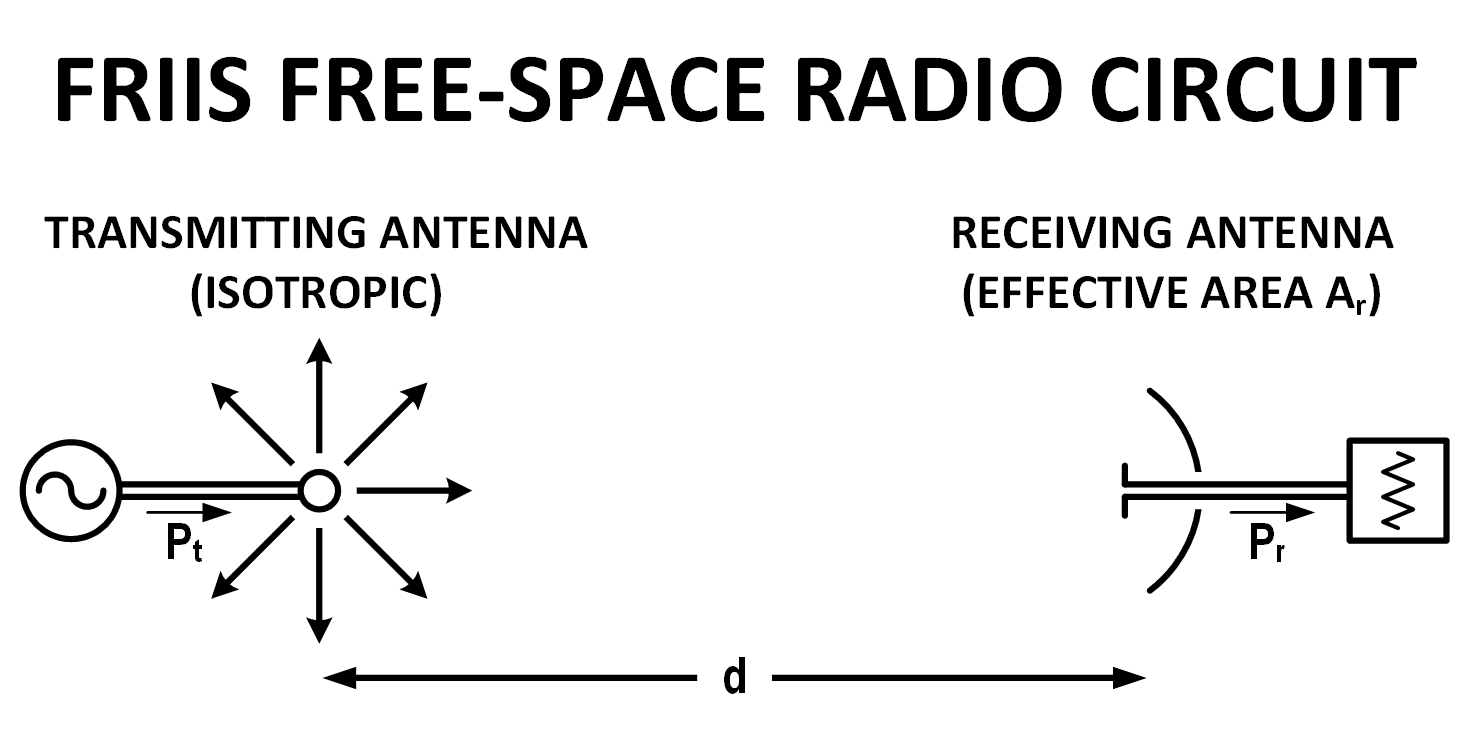
Friis' Free-space Radio Circuit.

This leads to his published form of his transmission formula:

$$\frac{P_r}{P_t} = \left( \frac{A_r A_t}{d^2\lambda^2 } \right)$$

where:

- $P_t$ is the power fed into the transmitting antenna input terminals;
- $P_r$ is the power available at receiving antenna output terminals;
- $A_r$ is the effective aperture area of the receiving antenna;
- $A_t$ is the effective aperture area of the transmitting antenna;
- $d$ is the distance between antennas;
- $\lambda$ is the wavelength of the radio frequency;
- $P_t$ and $P_r$ are in the same units of power;
- $A_r$, $A_t$, $d^2$, and $\lambda^2$ are in the same units.
- Distance $d$ large enough to ensure a plane wave front at the receive antenna sufficiently approximated by $d \geq 2a^2/\lambda$ where $a$ is the largest linear dimension of either of the antennas.

Friis stated the advantage of this formula over other formulations is the lack of numerical coefficients to remember, but does require the expression of transmitting antenna performance in terms of power flow per unit area instead of field strength and the expression of receiving antenna performance by its effective area rather than by its power gain or radiation resistance.

== Contemporary formula ==
Few follow Friis' advice on using antenna effective area to characterize antenna performance over the contemporary use of directivity and gain metrics. Replacing the effective antenna areas with their gain counterparts yields

$$\frac{P_r}{P_t} = G_t G_r \left( \frac{\lambda}{4 \pi d} \right)^2$$

where $G_t$ and $G_r$ are the antenna gains (with respect to an isotropic radiator) of the transmitting and receiving antennas respectively, $\lambda$ is the wavelength representing the effective aperture area of the receiving antenna, and $d$ is the distance separating the antennas. To use the equation as written, the antenna gains are unitless values, and the units for wavelength ($\lambda$) and distance ($d$) must be the same.

To calculate using decibels, the equation becomes:

$$P_r^\mathsf{[dB]} = P_t^\mathsf{[dB]} + G_t^\mathsf{[dBi]} + G_r^\mathsf{[dBi]} + 20\log_{10}\left( \frac{\lambda}{4 \pi d} \right)$$

where:

- $P_t^{[dB]}$ is the power delivered to the terminals of an isotropic transmit antenna, expressed in dB.
- $P_r^\mathsf{[dB]}$ is the available power at the receive antenna terminals equal to the product of the power density of the incident wave and the effective aperture area of the receiving antenna proportional to $\lambda^2$, in dB.
- $G_t^\mathsf{[dBi]}$ is the gain of the transmitting antenna in the direction of the receiving antenna, in dB.
- $G_r^\mathsf{[dBi]}$ is the gain of the receiving antenna in the direction of the transmitting antenna, in dB.

The simple form applies under the following conditions:

- $d\gg\lambda$, so that each antenna is in the far field of the other.
- The antennas are correctly aligned and have the same polarization.
- The antennas are in unobstructed free space, with no multipath propagation.
- The bandwidth is narrow enough that a single value for the wavelength can be used to represent the whole transmission.
- Directivities are both for isotropic radiators (dBi).
- Powers are both presented in the same units: either both dBm or both dBW.

The ideal conditions are almost never achieved in ordinary terrestrial communications, due to obstructions, reflections from buildings, and, most important, reflections from the ground. One situation where the equation is reasonably accurate is in satellite communications when there is negligible atmospheric absorption; another situation is in anechoic chambers specifically designed to minimize reflections.

== Derivation ==
There are several methods to derive the Friis transmission equation. In addition to the usual derivation from antenna theory, the basic equation also can be derived from principles of radiometry and scalar diffraction in a manner that emphasizes physical understanding. Another derivation is to take the far-field limit of the near-field transmission integral.

== Limitation of Applicability ==
Jaffe et al. point out that assumptions made in deriving the Friis equation mean that it has limited applicability to the case of power beaming:

"By inspection it can be seen that if the wavelength $\lambda$ is short enough, the formula will produce an anomalous result showing that more power can be received than is transmitted."

A related equation, the Goubau relationship, is more useful for power beaming applications.

== See also ==
- Link budget
- Radio propagation model
