= Horn antenna =

Funnel-shaped waveguide radio device

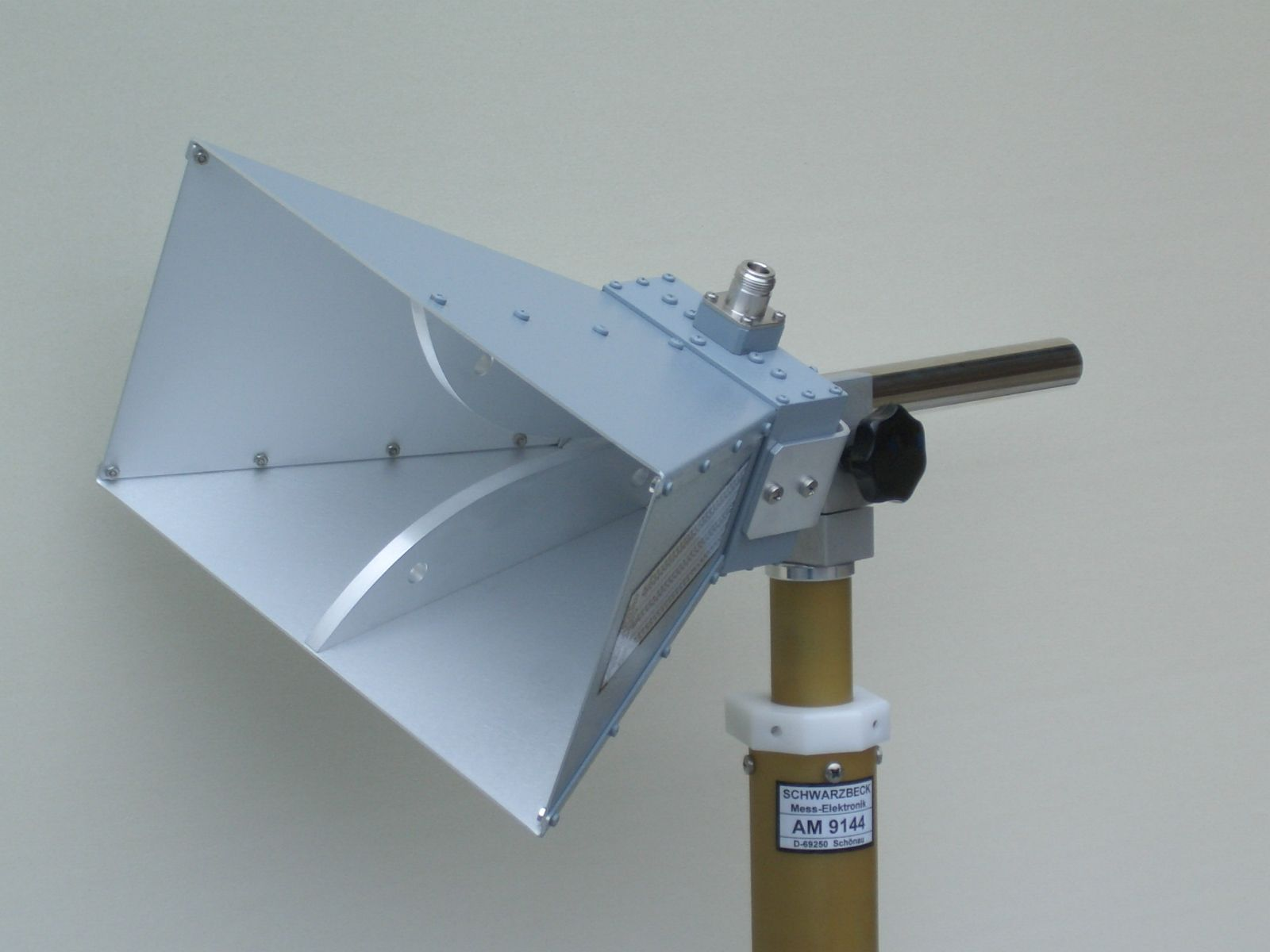
Pyramidal microwave horn antenna, with a bandwidth of 0.8 to 18 GHz. A coaxial cable feedline attaches to the connector visible at top. This type is called a ridged horn; the curving fins visible inside the mouth of the horn increase the antenna's bandwidth.

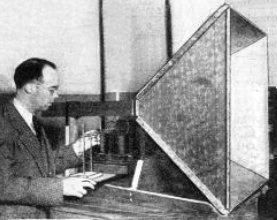
The first modern horn antenna in 1938 with inventor Wilmer L. Barrow.

A horn antenna or microwave horn is an antenna that consists of a flaring metal waveguide shaped like a horn to direct radio waves in a beam. Horns are widely used as antennas at UHF and microwave frequencies, above 300 MHz. They are used as feed antennas (called feed horns) for larger antenna structures such as parabolic antennas, as standard calibration antennas to measure the gain of other antennas, and as directive antennas for such devices as radar guns, automatic door openers, and microwave radiometers. Their advantages are moderate directivity, broad bandwidth, low losses, and simple construction and adjustment.

One of the first horn antennas was constructed in 1897 by Bengali-Indian radio researcher Jagadish Chandra Bose in his pioneering experiments with microwaves. The modern horn antenna was invented independently in 1938 by Wilmer Barrow and G. C. Southworth The development of radar in World War II stimulated horn research to design feed horns for radar antennas. The corrugated horn invented by Kay in 1962 has become widely used as a feed horn for microwave antennas such as satellite dishes and radio telescopes.

An advantage of horn antennas is that since they have no resonant elements, they can operate over a wide range of frequencies, a wide bandwidth. The usable bandwidth of horn antennas is typically of the order of 10:1, and can be up to 20:1 (for example allowing it to operate from 1 GHz to 20 GHz). The input impedance is slowly varying over this wide frequency range, allowing low voltage standing wave ratio (VSWR) over the bandwidth. The gain of horn antennas ranges up to 25 dBi, with 10–20 dBi being typical.

== Description ==
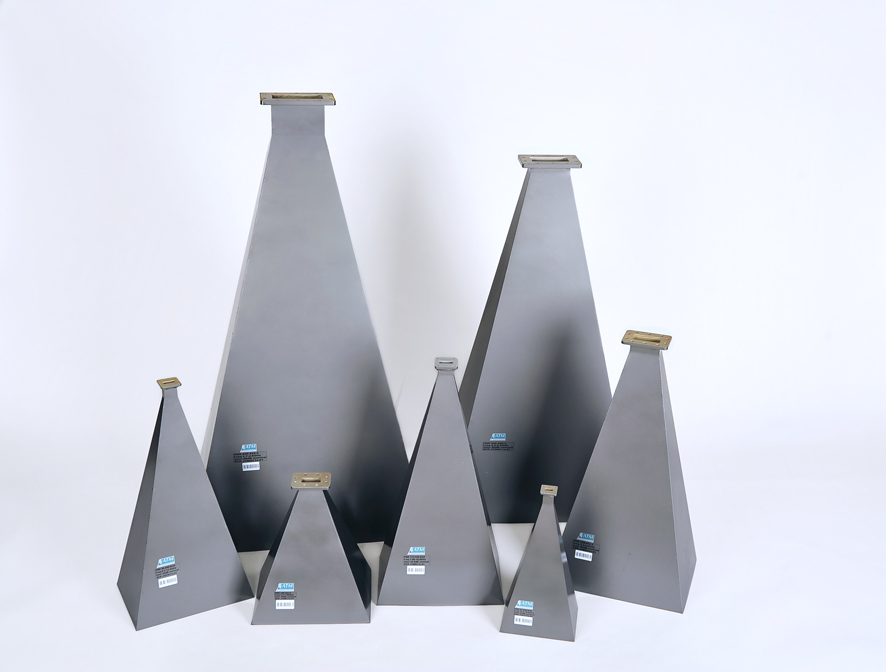
Pyramidal horn antennas for a variety of frequencies. They have flanges at the top to attach to standard waveguides.

A horn antenna is used to transmit radio waves from a waveguide (a metal pipe used to carry radio waves) out into space, or collect radio waves into a waveguide for reception. It typically consists of a short length of rectangular or cylindrical metal tube (the waveguide), closed at one end, flaring into an open-ended conical or pyramidal shaped horn on the other end. The radio waves are usually introduced into the waveguide by a coaxial cable attached to the side, with the central conductor projecting into the waveguide to form a quarter-wave monopole antenna. The waves then radiate out the horn end in a narrow beam. In some equipment the radio waves are conducted between the transmitter or receiver and the antenna by a waveguide; in this case the horn is attached to the end of the waveguide. In outdoor horns, such as the feed horns of satellite dishes, the open mouth of the horn is often covered by a plastic sheet transparent to radio waves, to exclude moisture.

== How it works ==
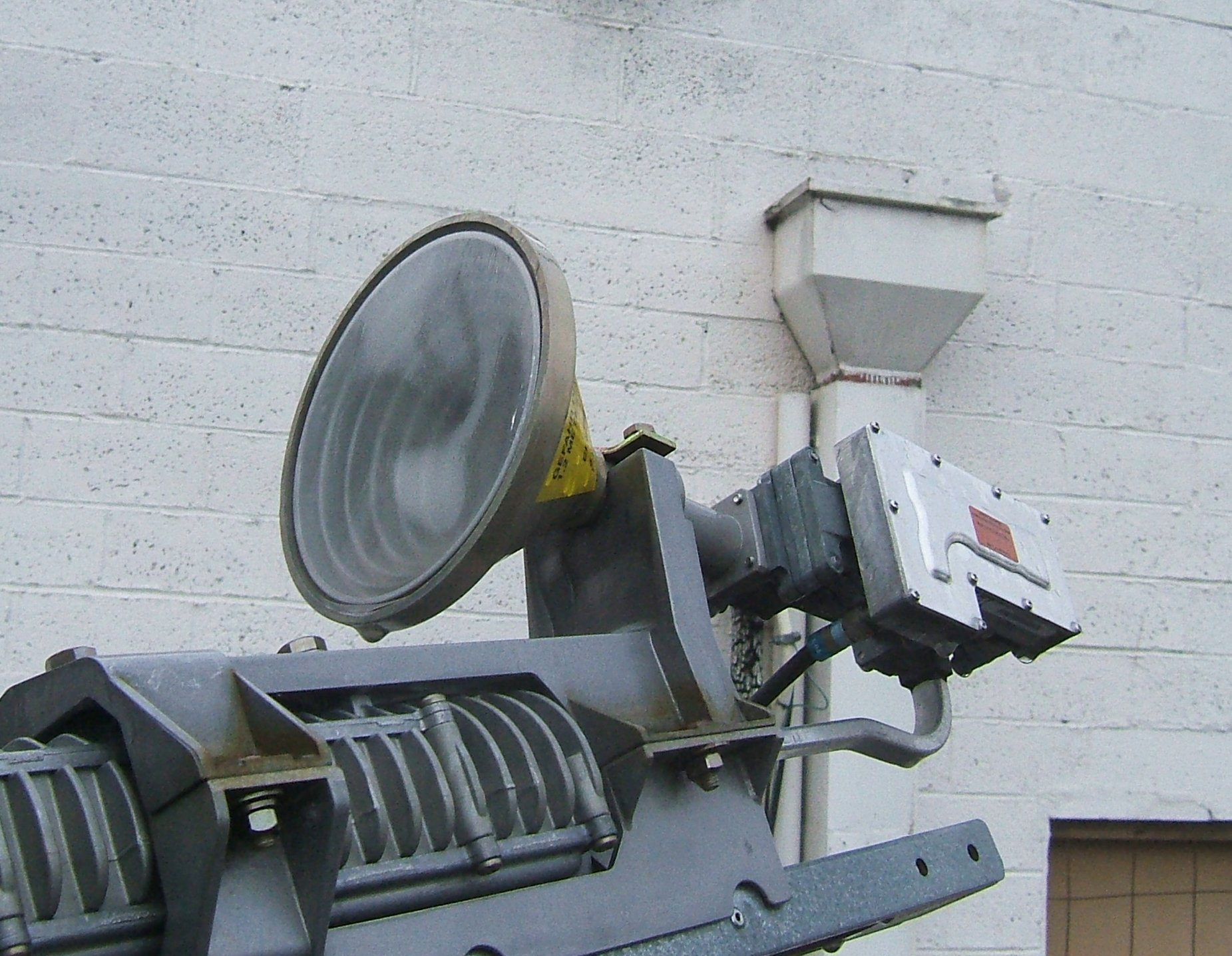
Corrugated conical horn antenna used as a feed horn on a Hughes Direcway home satellite dish. A transparent plastic sheet covers the horn mouth to keep out rain.

A horn antenna serves the same function for electromagnetic waves that an acoustical horn does for sound waves in a musical instrument such as a trumpet. It provides a gradual transition structure to match the impedance of a tube to the impedance of free space, enabling the waves from the tube to radiate efficiently into space.

If a simple open-ended waveguide is used as an antenna, without the horn, the sudden end of the conductive walls causes an abrupt impedance change at the aperture, from the wave impedance in the waveguide to the impedance of free space, (about 377 Ω). When radio waves travelling through the waveguide hit the opening, this impedance-step reflects a significant fraction of the wave energy back down the guide toward the source, so that not all of the power is radiated. This is similar to the reflection at an open-ended transmission line or a boundary between optical mediums with a low and high index of refraction, like at a glass surface. The reflected waves cause standing waves in the waveguide, increasing the SWR, wasting energy and possibly overheating the transmitter. In addition, the small aperture of the waveguide (less than one wavelength) causes significant diffraction of the waves issuing from it, resulting in a wide radiation pattern without much directivity.

To improve these poor characteristics, the ends of the waveguide are flared out to form a horn. The taper of the horn changes the impedance gradually along the horn's length. This acts like an impedance matching transformer, allowing most of the wave energy to radiate out the end of the horn into space, with minimal reflection. The taper functions similarly to a tapered transmission line, or an optical medium with a smoothly varying refractive index. In addition, the wide aperture of the horn projects the waves in a narrow beam.

The horn shape that gives minimum reflected power is an exponential taper. Exponential horns are used in special applications that require minimum signal loss, such as satellite antennas and radio telescopes. However conical and pyramidal horns are most widely used, because they have straight sides and are easier to design and fabricate.

== Radiation pattern ==
The waves travel down a horn as spherical wavefronts, with their origin at the apex of the horn, a point called the phase center. The pattern of electric and magnetic fields at the aperture plane at the mouth of the horn, which determines the radiation pattern, is a scaled-up reproduction of the fields in the waveguide. Because the wavefronts are spherical, the phase increases smoothly from the edges of the aperture plane to the center, because of the difference in length of the center point and the edge points from the apex point. The difference in phase between the center point and the edges is called the phase error. This phase error, which increases with the flare angle, reduces the gain and increases the beamwidth, giving horns wider beamwidths than similar-sized plane-wave antennas such as parabolic dishes.

At the flare angle, the radiation of the beam lobe is down about 20 dB from its maximum value.

As the size of a horn (expressed in wavelengths) is increased, the phase error increases, giving the horn a wider radiation pattern. Keeping the beamwidth narrow requires a longer horn (smaller flare angle) to keep the phase error constant. The increasing phase error limits the aperture size of practical horns to about 15 wavelengths; larger apertures would require impractically long horns. This limits the gain of practical horns to about 1000 (30 dBi) and the corresponding minimum beamwidth to about 5–10°.

== Types ==
Horn antenna types

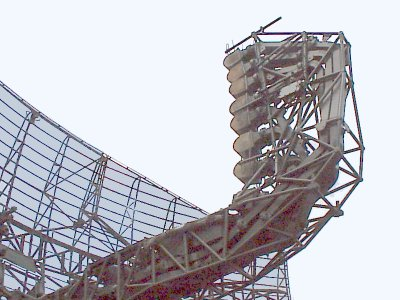
Stack of sectoral feed horns for air search radar antenna

Below are the main types of horn antennas. Horns can have different flare angles as well as different expansion curves (elliptic, hyperbolic, etc.) in the E-field and H-field directions, making possible a wide variety of different beam profiles.

Pyramidal horn (fig. a) – a horn antenna with the horn in the shape of a four-sided pyramid, with a rectangular cross section. They are a common type, used with rectangular waveguides, and radiate linearly polarized radio waves.
Sectoral horn – A pyramidal horn with only one pair of sides flared and the other pair parallel. It produces a fan-shaped beam, which is narrow in the plane of the flared sides, but wide in the plane of the narrow sides. These types are often used as feed horns for wide search radar antennas.

E-plane horn (fig. b) – A sectoral horn flared in the direction of the electric or E-field in the waveguide.
H-plane horn (fig. c) – A sectoral horn flared in the direction of the magnetic or H-field in the waveguide.

Conical horn (fig. d) – A horn in the shape of a cone, with a circular cross section. They are used with cylindrical waveguides.
Exponential horn (fig. e) – A horn with curved sides, in which the separation of the sides increases as an exponential function of length. Also called a scalar horn, they can have pyramidal or conical cross sections. Exponential horns have minimum internal reflections, and almost constant impedance and other characteristics over a wide frequency range. They are used in applications requiring high performance, such as feed horns for communication satellite antennas and radio telescopes.
Corrugated horn – A horn with parallel slots or grooves, small compared with a wavelength, covering the inside surface of the horn, transverse to the axis. Corrugated horns have wider bandwidth and smaller sidelobes and cross-polarization, and are widely used as feed horns for satellite dishes and radio telescopes.
Dual-mode conical horn – (The Potter horn) This horn can be used to replace the corrugated horn for use at sub-mm wavelengths where the corrugated horn is lossy and difficult to fabricate.
Diagonal horn – This simple dual-mode horn superficially looks like a pyramidal horn with a square output aperture. On closer inspection, however, the square output aperture is seen to be rotated 45° relative to the waveguide. These horns are typically machined into split blocks and used at sub-mm wavelengths.
Ridged horn – A pyramidal horn with ridges or fins attached to the inside of the horn, extending down the center of the sides. The fins lower the cutoff frequency, increasing the antenna's bandwidth.
Septum horn – A horn which is divided into several subhorns by metal partitions (septums) inside, attached to opposite walls.
Aperture-limited horn – a long narrow horn, long enough so the phase error is a negligible fraction of a wavelength, so it essentially radiates a plane wave. It has an aperture efficiency of 1.0 so it gives the maximum gain and minimum beamwidth for a given aperture size. The gain is not affected by the length but only limited by diffraction at the aperture. Used as feed horns in radio telescopes and other high-resolution antennas.
Open boundary quad-ridged horn – A special type of horn antenna designed as a four-pronged structure with open boundaries. It covers width the frequency range and polarization is dual linear.
Open boundary double-ridged horn – Similar to the open boundary quad-ridged horn above. It was designed to operate over a wide frequency range, low VSWR, and high gain.

== Optimum horn ==
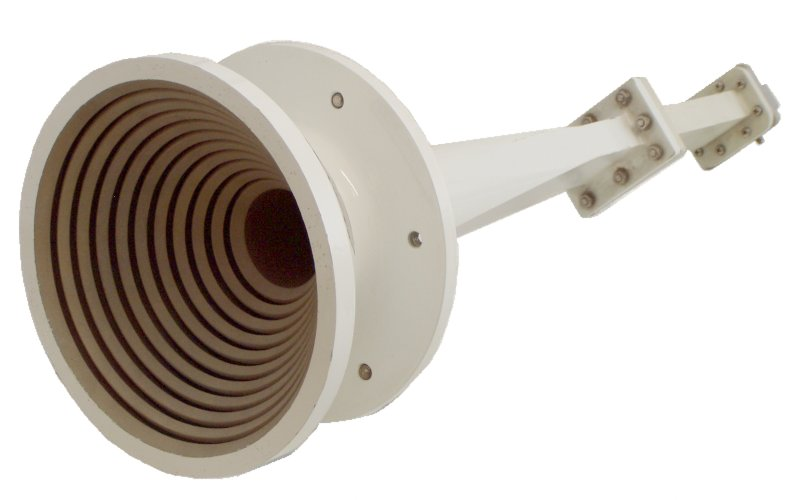
Corrugated horn antenna with a bandwidth of 3.7 to 6 GHz designed to attach to SMA waveguide feedline. This was used as a feedhorn for a parabolic antenna on a British military base.

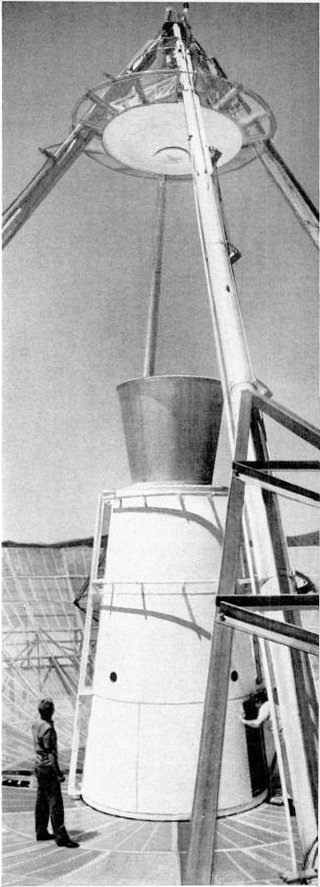
Exponential feed horn for 26-meter (85 ft) Cassegrain spacecraft communication antenna at NASA's Goldstone Deep Space Communications Complex.

For a given frequency and horn length, there is some flare angle that gives minimum reflection and maximum gain. The internal reflections in straight-sided horns come from the two locations along the wave path where the impedance changes abruptly; the mouth or aperture of the horn, and the throat where the sides begin to flare out. The amount of reflection at these two sites varies with the flare angle of the horn (the angle the sides make with the axis). In narrow horns with small flare angles most of the reflection occurs at the mouth of the horn. The gain of the antenna is low because the small mouth approximates an open-ended waveguide, with a large impedance step. As the angle is increased, the reflection at the mouth decreases rapidly and the antenna's gain increases. In contrast, in wide horns with flare angles approaching 90° most of the reflection is at the throat. The horn's gain is again low because the throat approximates an open-ended waveguide. As the angle is decreased, the amount of reflection at this site drops, and the horn's gain again increases.

This discussion shows that there is some flare angle between 0° and 90° which gives maximum gain and minimum reflection. This is called the optimum horn. Most practical horn antennas are designed as optimum horns. In a pyramidal horn, the dimensions that give an optimum horn are:

$$a_E = \sqrt{2 \lambda L_E} \qquad  a_H = \sqrt{3 \lambda L_H}$$

For a conical horn, the dimensions that give an optimum horn are:

$$d = \sqrt{3 \lambda L}$$

where

a_{E} is the width of the aperture in the E-field direction
a_{H} is the width of the aperture in the H-field direction
L_{E} is the slant height of the side in the E-field direction
L_{H} is the slant height of the side in the H-field direction
d is the diameter of the cylindrical horn aperture
L is the slant height of the cone from the apex
λ is the wavelength

An optimum horn does not yield maximum gain for a given aperture size. That is achieved with a very long horn (an aperture limited horn). The optimum horn yields maximum gain for a given horn length. Tables showing dimensions for optimum horns for various frequencies are given in microwave handbooks.

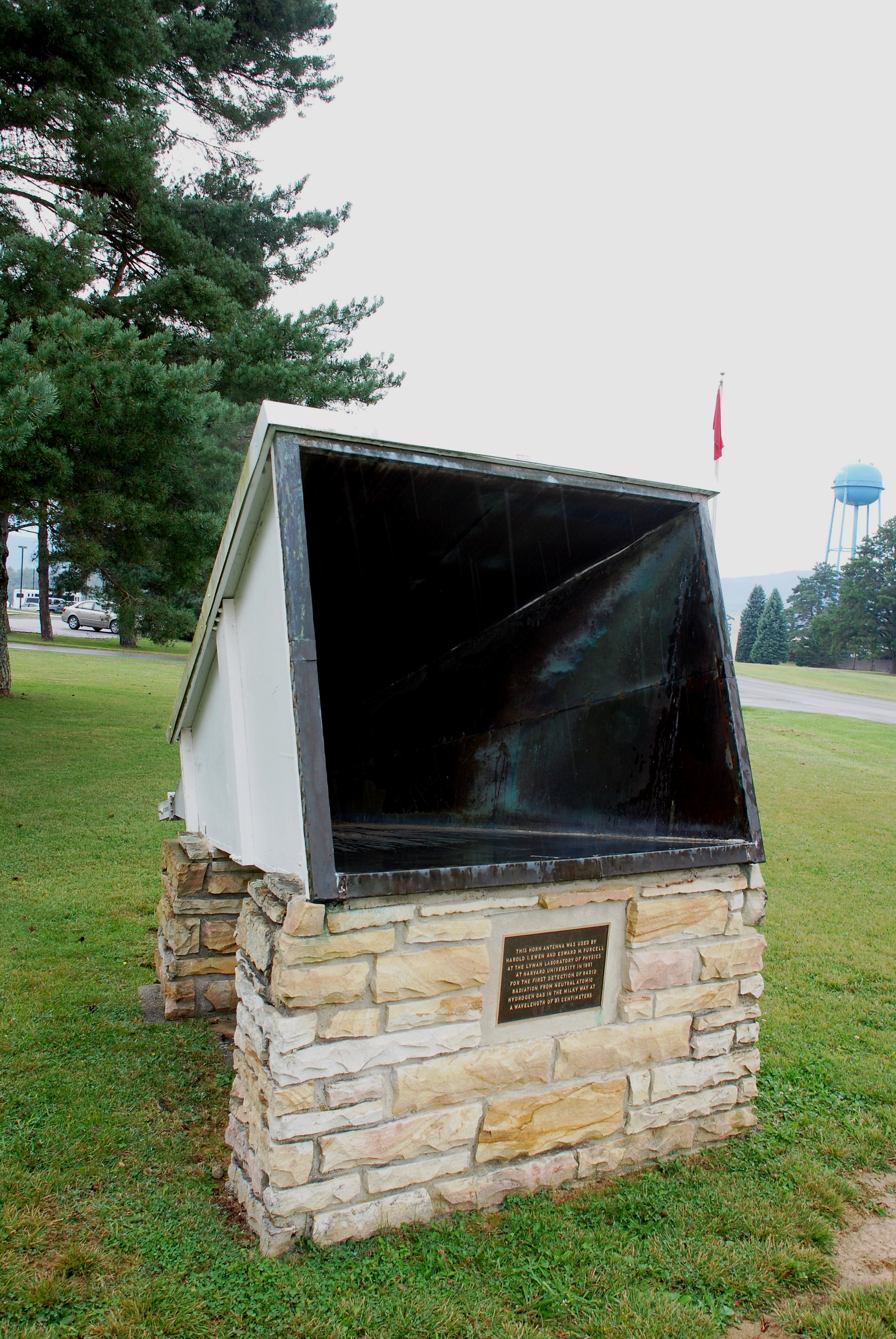
Large pyramidal horn used in 1951 to detect the 21 cm/8.3 inches (1.43 GHz) radiation from hydrogen gas in the Milky Way galaxy. Currently on display at the Green Bank Observatory in Green Bank, West Virginia, U.S.

== Gain ==
Horns have very little loss, so the directivity of a horn is roughly equal to its gain. The gain G of a pyramidal horn antenna (the ratio of the radiated power intensity along its beam axis to the intensity of an isotropic antenna with the same input power) is:

$$G = \frac{4 \pi A}{\lambda^2} e_A$$

For conical horns, the gain is:

$$G = \left (  \frac{\pi d}{\lambda} \right )^2 e_A$$

where

A is the area of the aperture,
d is the aperture diameter of a conical horn
λ is the wavelength,
e_{A} is a dimensionless parameter between 0 and 1 called the aperture efficiency,

The aperture efficiency ranges from 0.4 to 0.8 in practical horn antennas. For optimum pyramidal horns, e_{A} = 0.511., while for optimum conical horns e_{A} = 0.522. So an approximate figure of 0.5 is often used. The aperture efficiency increases with the length of the horn, and for aperture-limited horns is approximately unity.

== Horn-reflector antenna ==
A type of antenna that combines a horn with a parabolic reflector is known as a Hogg-horn, or horn-reflector antenna, invented by Alfred C. Beck and Harald T. Friis in 1941 and further developed by David C. Hogg at Bell Labs in 1961. It is also referred to as the "sugar scoop" due to its characteristic shape. It consists of a horn antenna with a reflector mounted in the mouth of the horn at a 45 degree angle so the radiated beam is at right angles to the horn axis. The reflector is a segment of a parabolic reflector, and the focus of the reflector is at the apex of the horn, so the device is equivalent to a parabolic antenna fed off-axis. The advantage of this design over a standard parabolic antenna is that the horn shields the antenna from radiation coming from angles outside the main beam axis, so its radiation pattern has very small sidelobes. Also, the aperture isn't partially obstructed by the feed and its supports, as with ordinary front-fed parabolic dishes, allowing it to achieve aperture efficiencies of 70% as opposed to 55–60% for front-fed dishes. The disadvantage is that it is far larger and heavier for a given aperture area than a parabolic dish, and must be mounted on a cumbersome turntable to be fully steerable. This design was used for a few radio telescopes and communication satellite ground antennas during the 1960s. Its largest use, however, was as fixed antennas for microwave relay links in the AT&T Long Lines microwave network. One of the best-known examples was the KS-15676 family of horns, designed as broadband antennae and marketed by Western Electric. Since the 1970s this design has been superseded by shrouded parabolic dish antennas, which can achieve equally good sidelobe performance with a lighter more compact construction. Probably the most photographed and well-known example is the 15-meter-long (50-foot) Holmdel Horn Antenna at Bell Labs in Holmdel, New Jersey, with which Arno Penzias and Robert Wilson discovered cosmic microwave background radiation in 1965, for which they won the 1978 Nobel Prize in Physics. Another more recent horn-reflector design is the cass-horn, which is a combination of a horn with a cassegrain parabolic antenna using two reflectors.

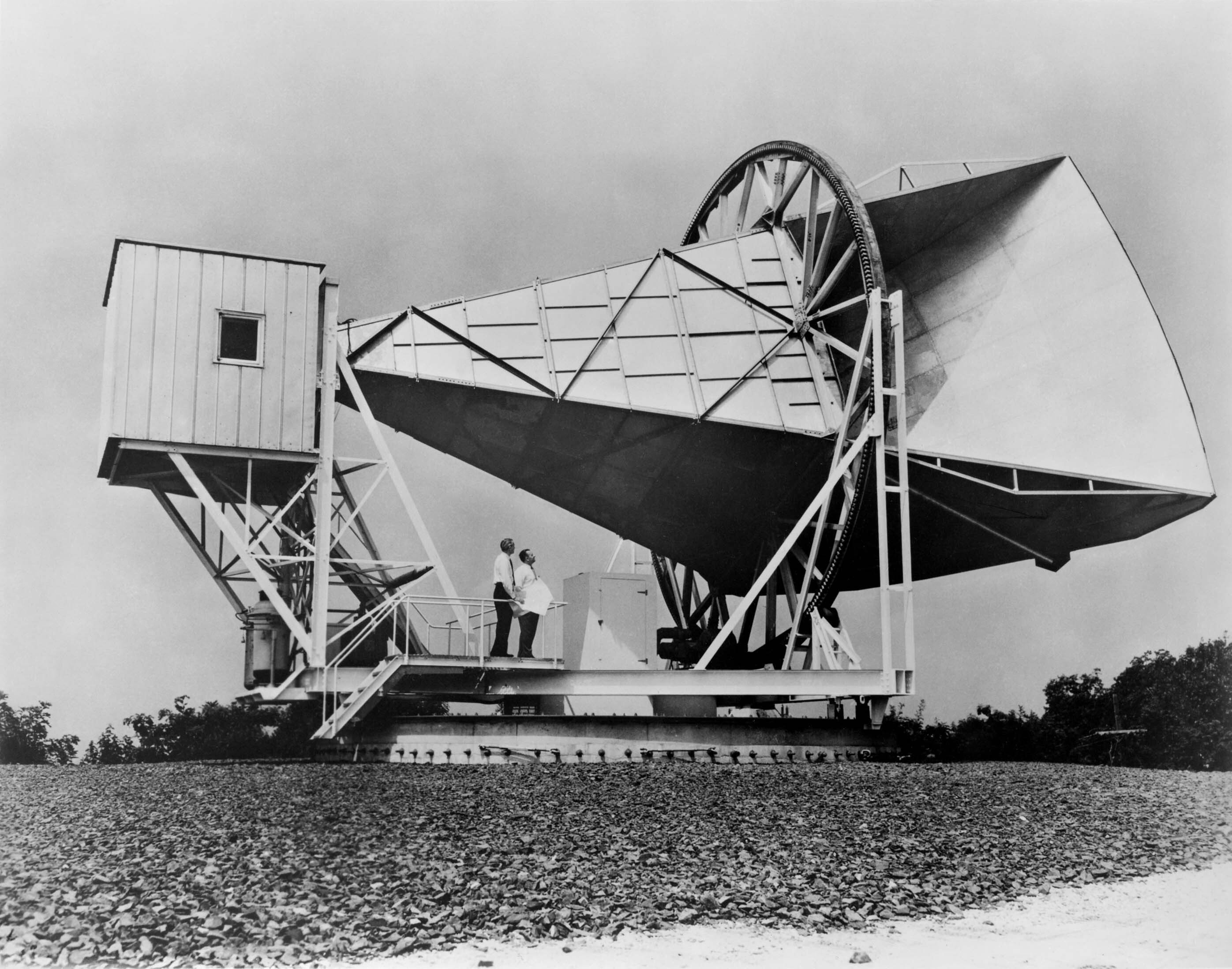
15-meter (50 ft) Holmdel horn antenna at Bell Labs in Holmdel, New Jersey, USA, with which Arno Penzias and Robert Wilson discovered cosmic microwave background radiation in 1964.

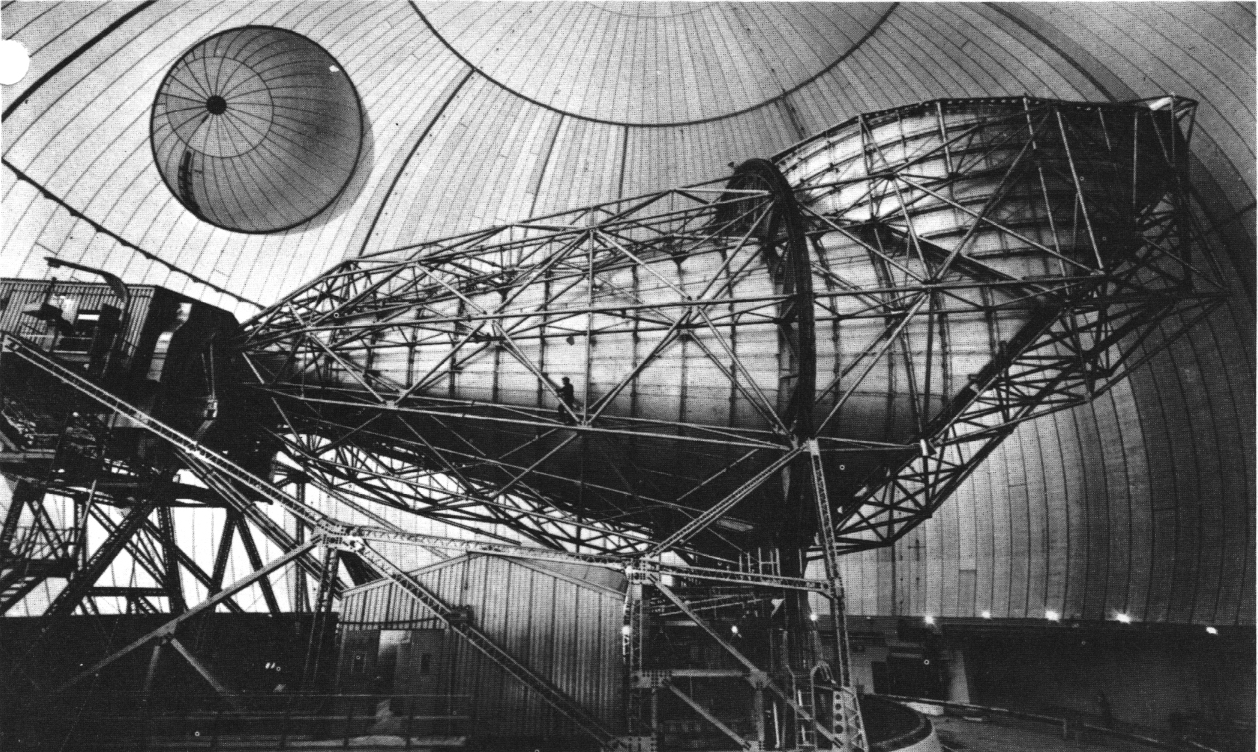
Large 54-meter (177 ft) horn reflector antenna at AT&T satellite communications facility in Andover, Maine, USA, used in 1960s to communicate with the first direct relay communications satellite, Telstar.

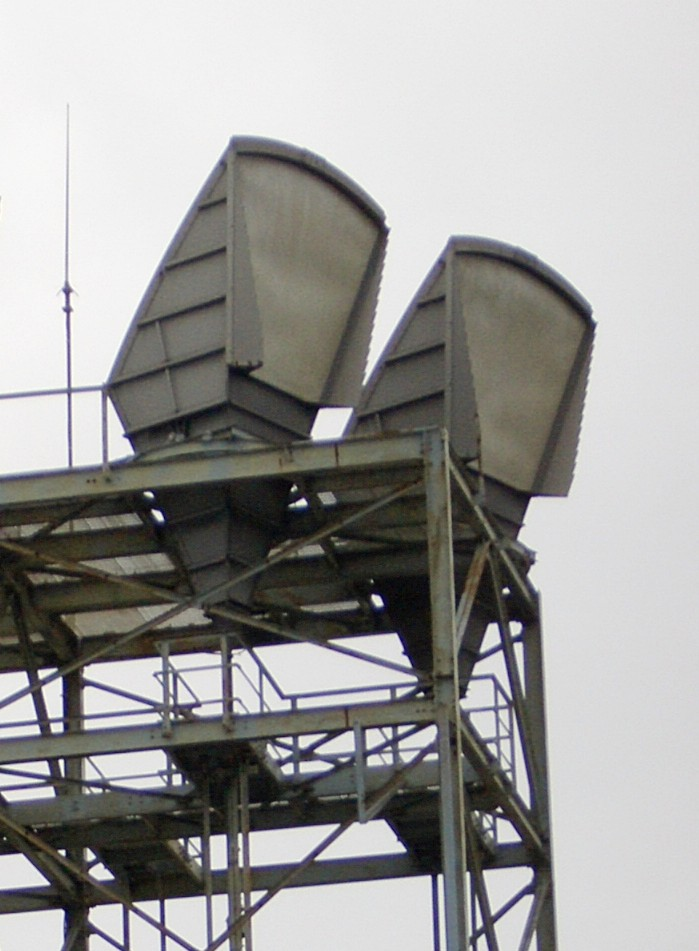
AT&T Long-Lines KS-15676 C-band (4–6 GHz) microwave relay horn-reflector antennas on roof of AT&T telephone switching center, Seattle, Washington, USA

Horn-reflector antennas

== See also ==
- Microwave Radiometer (Juno) (uses 1 horn antenna for Jupiter observations)
