= AWX antenna =

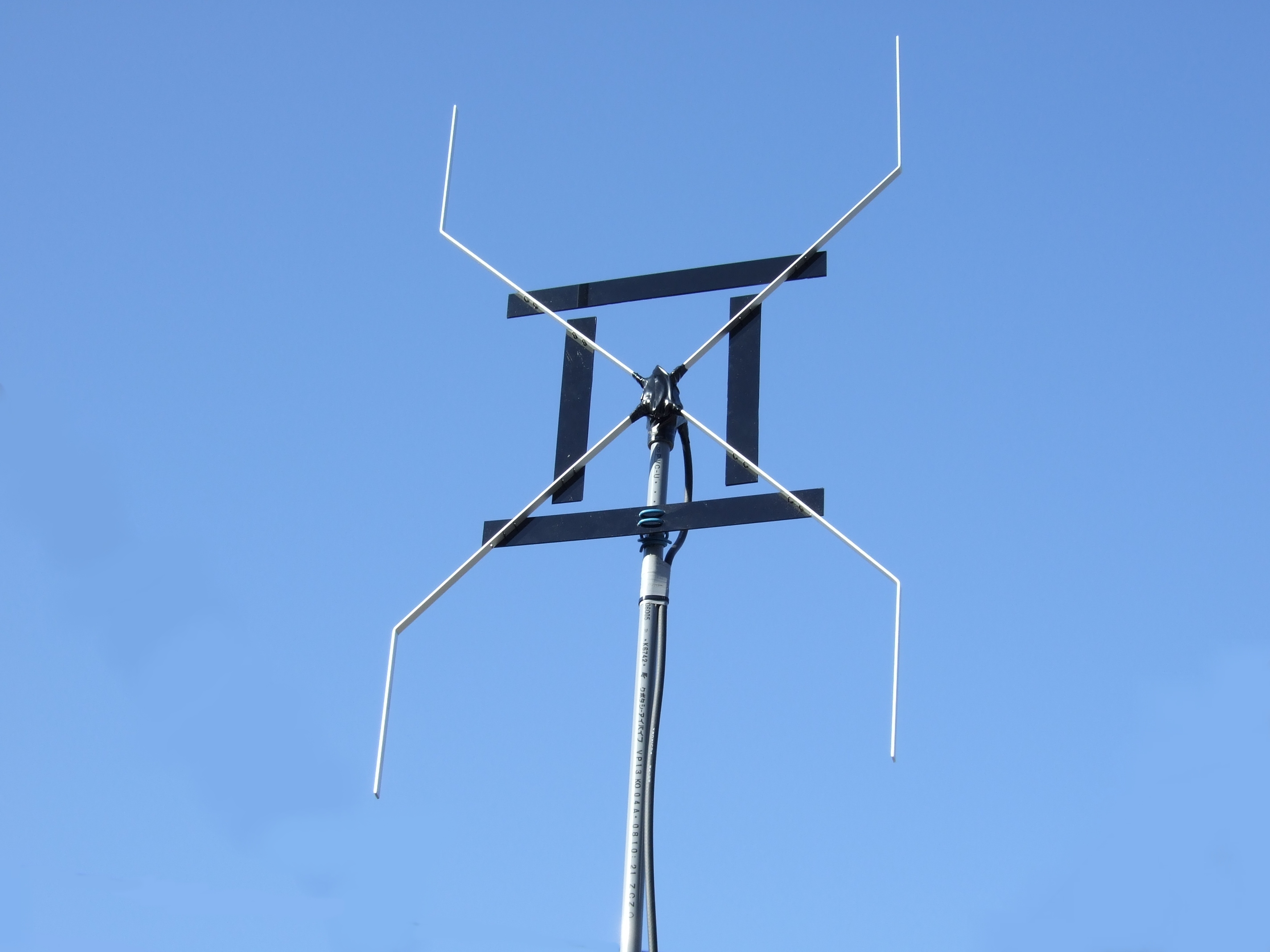
An altered AWX antenna which had been designed and built by an amateur radio operator and has been used by the amateur radio station.

An AWX antenna is an antenna which means that it can be used for All Wave radio frequency and is shaped like X.

It has two V-shaped elements. Two types to place these two elements exist for this antenna. First, one element is placed left side spreading out for left and the other element is placed right side spreading out for right. This is balanced type. Second, one element is placed upper side spreading out for upward and the other element is placed lower side spreading out for downward. This is unbalanced type.

RF energy is fed at two vertices of each element.

It can be used in very wide frequency range whose gain is higher than a dipole antenna. To obtain enough antenna gain, the antenna must be set at enough high place off the ground to avoid the effect of the ground.

The antenna is used by radio stations which need to communicate in wide frequency range, such as amateur radios, military radios, and maritime mobile services.

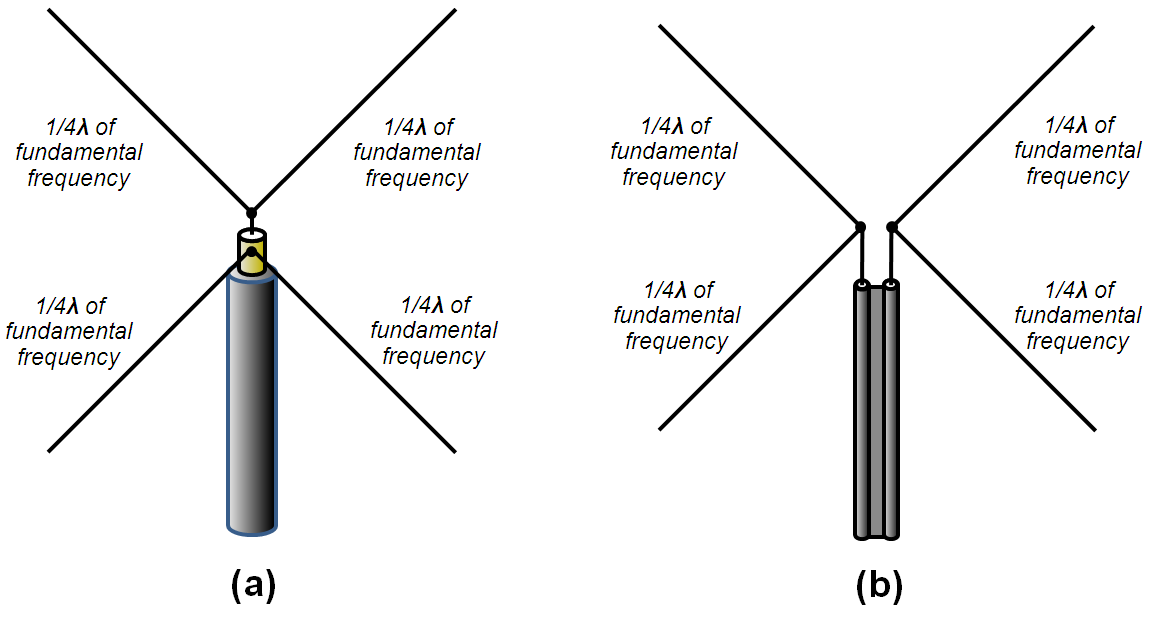
Typical feeding types of AWX antennas: (a) Transverse magnetic, unbalanced feeding. (b) (Mainly) transverse electric, balanced feeding.
