= Link margin =

In a wireless communication system, the link margin (LKM) is a critical parameter that measures the reliability and robustness of the communication link. It is expressed in decibels (dB) and represents the difference between the minimum expected power received at the receiver's end and the receiver's sensitivity. The receiver's sensitivity is the minimum received power level at which the receiver can correctly decode the signal and function properly.

== Link margin (LKM) ==
=== Definition ===
Link margin (LKM)=P_{received}−P_{sensitivity}

Where

- P_{received} is the minimum expected power received at the receiver.
- P_{sensitivity} is the receiver's sensitivity, which is the threshold below which the receiver can no longer correctly decode the signal.

It is typical to design a system with at least a few dB of link margin, to allow for attenuation that is not modeled elsewhere. For example, a satellite communications system operating in the tens of gigahertz might require additional link margin (vs. the link budget assuming lossless propagation), in order to ensure that it still works with the extra losses due to rain fade or other external factors.

A system with a negative link margin cannot transfer data, so one or more of the following are needed: more transmitter power; more antenna gain at the receiver or transmitter; less propagation loss (e.g., better antenna locations and/or shorter paths); lower receiver noise figure; improved error correction coding (FEC); reduced interference; or a lower data rate.

=== Importance of link margin ===
1. Reliability: A higher link margin indicates a more robust communication link that can withstand greater levels of interference, signal fading, and other impairments without losing connectivity.
2. Coverage area: Link margin impacts the coverage area of a wireless network. Higher link margins allow for greater distances between the transmitter and receiver, expanding the effective range of the communication system.
3. Quality of service: Ensuring an adequate link margin helps maintain the quality of service by minimizing dropped connections and ensuring stable data transmission.
4. Interference management: In environments with high levels of interference, such as urban areas or industrial settings, a higher link margin helps mitigate the effects of external signals that could disrupt communication.

== Additional references ==
=== Book ===
- Rappaport, T. S. (2002). Wireless Communications: Principles and Practice. Prentice Hall. This book covers the fundamentals of wireless communication, including link budget analysis and link margin considerations.

=== Technical paper ===
  - Goldsmith, A. (2005). Wireless Communications. Cambridge University Press. This textbook includes detailed discussions on link budgets, link margin, and the factors affecting wireless communication performance.
