= ITU-R P.525 =

ITU-R recommendation for the calculation of free-space attenuation

ITU-R P.525 is the International Telecommunication Union radiocommunications standard for the calculation of free-space attenuation.

== See also ==
- Free space loss
