= Wilmer L. Barrow =

American electrical engineer

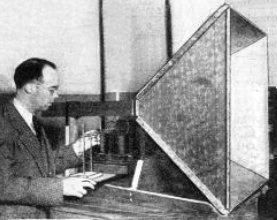
- Barrow with the first horn antenna
- Born: July 26, 1903; Baton Rouge, Louisiana, U.S.
- Died: August 29, 1975 (aged 72); Tuftonboro, New Hampshire, U.S.
- Education: Technical University of Munich
- Awards: IEEE Edison Medal (1966)
- Scientific career
- Doctoral students: Lan Jen Chu

Wilmer Lanier Barrow (July 26, 1903 – August 29, 1975) was an American electrical engineer, inventor, teacher, industrial manager, and a counselor to government agencies. He obtained a BSEE degree in 1926 from Louisiana State University, and a doctorate from the Technical University of Munich in 1931. During the pre-World War 2 development of radar at Massachusetts Institute of Technology, Barrow performed research on microwaves, inventing waveguide in 1936 and the horn antenna in 1938.

He was vice president for research, development and engineering of the Sperry Rand Corporation.

He was elected to the grade of Fellow in the IEEE in 1941, and a Fellow of the American Academy of Arts and Sciences in 1942. In 1943 he received the IEEE Morris N. Liebmann Memorial Award In 1966 he received the IEEE Edison Medal.
