= Radiation efficiency =

Telecommunications performance metric

In antenna theory, radiation efficiency is a measure of how well a radio antenna converts the radio-frequency power accepted at its terminals into radiated power. Likewise, in a receiving antenna it describes the proportion of the radio wave's power intercepted by the antenna which is actually delivered as an electrical signal. It is not to be confused with antenna efficiency, which applies to aperture antennas such as a parabolic reflector or phased array, or antenna/aperture illumination efficiency, which relates the maximum directivity of an antenna/aperture to its standard directivity.

== Definition ==
Radiation efficiency is defined as "The ratio of the total power radiated by an antenna to the net power accepted by the antenna from the connected transmitter." It is sometimes expressed as a percentage (less than 100), and is frequency dependent. It can also be described in decibels. The gain of an antenna is the directivity multiplied by the radiation efficiency. Thus, we have

$$G= e_R \, D$$

where $G$ is the gain of the antenna in a specified direction, $e_R$ is the radiation efficiency, and $D$ is the directivity of the antenna in the specified direction.

For wire antennas which have a defined radiation resistance the radiation efficiency is the ratio of the radiation resistance to the total resistance of the antenna including ground loss (see below) and conductor resistance. In practical cases the resistive loss in any tuning and/or matching network is often included, although network loss is strictly not a property of the antenna.

For other types of antenna the radiation efficiency is less easy to calculate and is usually determined by measurements.

== Radiation efficiency of an antenna or antenna array having several ports ==
In the case of an antenna or antenna array having multiple ports, the radiation efficiency depends on the excitation. More precisely, the radiation efficiency depends on the relative phases and the relative amplitudes of the signals applied to the different ports. This dependence is always present, but it is easier to interpret in the case where the interactions between the ports are sufficiently small. These interactions may be large in many actual configurations, for instance in an antenna array built in a mobile phone to provide spatial diversity and/or spatial multiplexing. In this context, it is possible to define an efficiency metric as the minimum radiation efficiency for all possible excitations, denoted by $e_{R\,MIN}$, which is related to the radiation efficiency figure given by $F_{RE}=\sqrt{1-e_{R\,MIN}}$.

Another interesting efficiency metric is the maximum radiation efficiency for all possible excitations, denoted by $e_{R\,MAX}$. It is possible to consider that using $e_{R\,MIN}$ as design parameter is particularly relevant to a multiport antenna array intended for MIMO transmission with spatial multiplexing, and that using $e_{R\,MAX}$ as design parameter is particularly relevant to a multiport antenna array intended for beamforming in a single direction or over a small solid angle.

== Measurement of the radiation efficiency ==
Measurements of the radiation efficiency are difficult. Classical techniques include the ″Wheeler method″ (also referred to as ″Wheeler cap method″) and the ″Q factor method″. The Wheeler method uses two impedance measurements, one of which with the antenna located in a metallic box (the cap). Unfortunately, the presence of the cap is likely to significantly modify the current distribution on the antenna, so that the resulting accuracy is difficult to determine. The Q factor method does not use a metallic enclosure, but the method is based on the assumption that the Q factor of an ideal antenna is known, the ideal antenna being identical to the actual antenna except that the conductors have perfect conductivity and any dielectrics have zero loss. Thus, the Q factor method is only semi-experimental, because it relies on a theoretical computation using an assumed geometry of the actual antenna. Its accuracy is also difficult to determine. Other radiation efficiency measurement techniques include: the pattern integration method, which requires gain measurements over many directions and two polarizations; and reverberation chamber techniques, which utilize a mode-stirred reverberation chamber.

== Ohmic and ground loss ==
The loss of radio-frequency power to heat can be subdivided many different ways, depending on the number of significantly lossy objects electrically coupled to the antenna, and on the level of detail desired. Typically the simplest is to consider two types of loss: ohmic loss and ground loss. (Note: Technically, all heat-producing voltage loss is “Ohmic” electrical resistance, but in this context the term is used to refer only to loss in the radiating parts of the antenna and their feeds.)

When discussed as distinct from ground loss, the term ohmic loss refers to the heat-producing resistance to the flow of radio current in the conductors of the antenna, their electrical connections, and possibly loss in the antenna's feed cable. Because of the skin effect, resistance to radio-frequency current is generally much higher than direct current resistance.

For vertical monopoles and other antennas placed near the ground, ground loss occurs due to the electrical resistance encountered by radio-frequency fields and currents passing through the soil in the vicinity of the antenna, as well as ohmic resistance in metal objects in the antenna's surroundings (such as its mast or stalk), and ohmic resistance in its ground plane / counterpoise, and in electrical and mechanical bonding connections. When considering antennas that are mounted a few wavelengths above the earth on a non-conducting, radio-transparent mast, ground losses are small enough compared to conductor losses that they can be ignored. (Note: Some of the waves radiated by any antenna will be reflected off of the ground and back up into the air. Because this typically happens far from the antenna, losses associated with distant ground reflection are usually considered separately from losses in the ground near the antenna.)
