= Isotropic radiation =

Radiation with same intensity in all directions

Isotropic radiation is radiation that has the same intensity regardless of the direction of measurement, such as what would be found in a thermal cavity. This can be electromagnetic radiation, sound, or elementary particles.
