= Index of radio propagation articles =

This is an index to articles about terms used in discussion of radio propagation.

== A ==
A-index - active region - Alfvén wave - amateur radio bands - anomalous propagation - antenna height above average terrain - area-to-area Lee model - American Radio Relay League (ARRL) - atmospheric duct - aurora -

== B ==
backscatter - bow shock - brightness temperature - broadcast range - burst transmission -

== C ==
Cassegrain antenna - celestial equator - cellular telephony - Chapman function - clutter (radar) - co-channel interference - coherence bandwidth - coherence time - communication with submarines - computation of radiowave attenuation in the atmosphere - Conder plot - conjugate points - corona - coronagraph - coronal hole - coronal loops - coronal mass ejection - cosmic noise - cosmic ray - COST Hata model - COST 231 model - Coverage map - C_{p} index - creeping wave - critical frequency - Critical hours -

== D ==
D region - decibel - delay spread - Dellinger effect - differential rotation - dipole antenna - directional antenna - diurnal phase shift - diversity combining - diversity scheme - Doppler effect - Doppler shift - dose rate - Dst index - DXing -

== E ==
E region - E-layer - E-skip - Early ITU model - Earth bulge - Earth–ionosphere waveguide - Earth Observing System (EOS) - Earth-Moon-Earth - eclipse - ecliptic - Effective Earth radius - Egli model - electric beacon - electrojet - electromagnetic electron wave - electrostatic discharge - emission line - ephemeris - equatorial electrojet - equinox - Evershed effect - exosphere - expert system - extraordinary mode - extreme ultraviolet - extremely high frequency - extremely low frequency (ELF) -

== F ==
F region - F-layer - f-spot - facula - fade margin - fading - fading distribution - filament (solar physics) - flare (solar physics) - flutter (electronics and communication) - FM DX - Forbush decrease - forward scatter - free space - free-space path loss - frequency of optimum transmission - frequency-hopping spread spectrum - Fresnel zone - Friis transmission equation -

== G ==
gamma rays - geomagnetic field - geomagnetic storm - geomagnetism - geosynchronous - Geostationary Meteorological Satellite (GMS) - GMT - Geostationary Operational Environmental Satellite (GOES) - ghosting (television) - GPS - ground conductivity - Ground plane - ground wave - group velocity -

== H ==
Hata model for open areas - Hata model for suburban areas - Hata model for urban areas - heliosphere - helmet streamer - high frequency - high latitude - HRS type antennas -

== I ==
Interference (wave propagation) - International Association of Geomagnetism and Aeronomy (IAG) - International Cometary Explorer (ICE) - International Geophysical Year (IGY) - International Magnetospheric Study (IMS) - intermediate-field region - interplanetary magnetic field (IMF) - interplanetary scintillation - inversion (meteorology) - ion-acoustic wave - ionogram - ionosphere - ionospheric absorption - ionospheric reflection - ionospheric sounding - ionospheric storm - ITU model for indoor attenuation - ITU terrain model -

== K ==
K-index - Kelvin–Helmholtz instability - Kennelly–Heaviside layer - knife-edge effect - K_{p} index - Kitt Peak National Observatory (KPNO) -

== L ==
long-delayed echo (LDE) - line-of-sight propagation - linear energy transfer (LET) - link budget - Log-distance path loss model - Longley–Rice model - low frequency - low probability of intercept - low-gain antenna - low-power communication device - lowest usable frequency (LUF) - lowest usable high frequency -

== M ==
magnetic cloud - magneto-ionic double refraction - magnetogram (solar magnetogram) - magnetohydrodynamics (MHD) - magnetopause - magnetosheath - magnetosphere - magnetotail - material scattering - Maunder minimum - maximum usable frequency (MUF) - Maxwell's equations - medium frequency - mesosphere - meteor burst communications - meteor scatter - microwaves - middle latitude - Mie scattering - Mie theory - Miniprop - Moreton wave - multipath interference - multipath propagation - mush zone - MW DX -

== N ==
National Bureau of Standards (NBS) - National Center for Atmospheric Research (NCAR) - Near Vertical Incidence Skywave - National Geophysical Data Center (NGDC) - National Institute of Standards and Technology (NIST) - non-line-of-sight propagation - National Solar Observatory (NSO) -

== O ==
Okumura model - one woodland terminal model - ordinary mode -

== P ==
path loss - path profile - path quality analysis - penumbra - perigee - perihelion - photosphere - plasma - plasma frequency - plasmapause - plasmasphere - point-to-point Lee model - Polar mesospheric summer echoes - power delay profile - prominence - propagation path obstruction - propagation graph - pulse (signal processing) -

== R ==
radiation belt - radiation scattering - radio blackout - Radio direction finder - radio frequency - radio horizon - radio propagation - radio propagation beacon - radio propagation model - Radio Society of Great Britain - ray tracing (physics) - Rayleigh fading - Rayleigh–Taylor instability - rain fade - reference distance - relative transmission level - RF planning - Rician fading - ring current - riometer - Radio Solar Telescope Network (RSTN) -

== S ==
Schumann resonance - selective fading - Shadow loss - shortwave relay station - side lobe - Signal-to-Interference Ratio - single event upset (SEU) - Single vegetative obstruction model - SINPO code - skip (radio) - skip zone - sky wave - skywave - Solar Maximum Mission (SMM) - Synchronous Meteorological Satellite (SMS) - software-defined radio - solar activity - solar constant - solar cycle - solar flare - solar flux - solar flux unit - solar maximum - solar minimum - solar radiation storm level - solar rotation rate - solar transition region - solar wind - solstice - Solar Observing Optical Network (SOON) - South Atlantic anomaly - Southern Hemisphere Auroral Radar Experiment - space weather - spicule (solar physics) - SPLAT! - sporadic E propagation - spray (solar physics) - spread spectrum - stratosphere - substorm - sudden ionospheric disturbance (SID) - sunspot - sunspot cycle - sunspot number - super high frequency (SHF) - supergranulation - surface wave - survey magnetometers - Solar X-ray Imager (SXI) - synodic - synoptic chart -

== T ==
thermal fade - thermosphere - time signal - total electron content - troposphere - tropospheric propagation - tropospheric scatter - tropospheric wave - TV and FM DX -

== U ==
UHF - UHF CB - ultrahigh frequency - ultraviolet - umbra - Union Radio Scientifique Internationale (URSI) -

== V ==
Van Allen radiation belts - very high frequency - very low frequency - VOACAP -

== W ==
wave propagation - Weibull fading - Weissberger's model - White Alice Communications System - Wolf number - WWV (radio station) -

== X ==
X band - X-band - X-ray - X-ray background - X-ray burst -

== Y ==
Young model -

== Z ==
Zeeman effect -

== See also ==
- Index of radiation articles
