= Area-to-area Lee model =

Radio propagation model

The Lee model for area-to-area mode is a radio propagation model used to predict a path loss over flat terrain. The model provides a modified power law with correction factors for antenna heights and frequency.

== Applicable to/under conditions ==
This model is suitable for using in data collected. The model predicts the behaviour of all links that has ends in specific areas.

== Coverage ==
Originally developed for use at 900 MHz, the model includes an adjustment factor to increase the frequency range.

== Mathematical formulation ==
=== The model ===
The Lee model is formally expressed as:

$L \; = \; L_0 \; + \; \gamma \log d \; - 10 \log {F_A}$

where,

L = The median path loss. Unit: decibel (dB)
L_{0} = The reference path loss along 1 km. Unit: decibel (dB)
$\gamma\;$ = The slope of the path loss curve. Unit: decibels per decade
d = The distance on which the path loss is to be calculated.
F_{A} = Adjustment factor.

=== Calculation of reference path loss ===
The reference path loss is usually computed along a 1 km or 1 mile link. Any other suitable length of path can be chosen based on the applications.

$L_0 \; = \; G_B \; + \; G_M \; + \; 20 \; (\log \lambda \; - \; \log d) \; - \; 22$

where,

G_{B} = Base station antenna gain. Unit: decibel with respect to isotropic antenna (dBi)
$\lambda$ = Wavelength. Unit: meter (m).
G_{M} = Mobile station antenna gain. Unit: decibel with respect to isotropic antenna (dBi).

=== Calculation of adjustment factors ===
The adjustment factor is calculated as:

$F_A \; = \; F_{BH} \; F_{BG} \; F_{MH} \; F_{MG} \; F_{F}$

where,

F_{BH} = Base station antenna height correction factor.
F_{BG} = Base station antenna gain correction factor.
F_{MH} = Mobile station antenna height correction factor.
F_{MG} = Mobile station antenna gain correction factor.
F_{F} = Frequency correction factor

=== Base-station antenna height correction factor ===
$F_{BH} \; = \; \left( \; \frac{h_B}{30.48} \; \right)^2$

where,

h_{B} = Base-station antenna height. Unit: meter (m).

or

$F_{BH} \; = \; \left( \; \frac{h_B}{100} \; \right)^2$

where,

h_{B} = Base-station antenna height. Unit: foot (ft).

=== Base-station antenna gain correction factor ===
$F_{BG} \; = \; \frac{G_B}{4}$

where,

G_{B} = Base-station antenna gain. Unit: decibel with respect to half wave dipole antenna (dBd)

=== Mobile-station antenna height correction factor ===
$$F_{MH}\;=\;\begin{cases}\;\;\frac{h_M} {3} \;\;\;\;\mbox{ if, } h_M > 3 \\ \Big( \frac {h_M}{3} \Big)^2 \mbox{       if, }h_M \le 3 \end{cases}$$

where,

h_{M} = Mobile-station antenna height. Unit: meter(m).

=== Mobile-antenna gain correction factor ===
$F_{MG} \; = \; G_M$

where,

G_{M} = Mobile-station antenna gain. Unit: Decibel with respect to half wave dipole antenna (dBd).

=== Frequency correction factor ===
$F_F\;=\;\big( \frac{f}{900} \big)^{-n} \mbox{ for } 2 < n < 3$

where,

f = Frequency. Unit: megahertz (MHz)

== See also ==
- Hata model
- Okumura model
- COST 231 model
- Young model
- Point-to-point Lee model
