= Point-to-point Lee model =

Radio propagation model

The Lee model for point-to-point mode is a radio propagation model that operates around 900 MHz. Built as two different modes, this model includes an adjustment factor that can be adjusted to make the model more flexible to different regions of propagation. It is named after William C. Y. Lee.

== Applicable to/under conditions ==
This model is suitable for using in data collected in a specific area for point-to-point links.

== Coverage ==
Frequency: 900 MHz band

== Mathematical formulation ==
=== The model ===
The Lee model for point to point mode is formally expressed as:

$L = L_0 + \gamma g \log d - 10 \left(\log {F_A} - 2 \log \left(\frac{H_{ET}}{30}\right)\right)$

where,

L = The median path loss. Unit: decibel (dB).

L_{0} = The reference path loss along 1 km. Unit: decibel (dB).

$\gamma\;$ = The slope of the path loss curve. Unit: decibels per decade.

d = The distance on which the path loss is to be calculated. Unit: kilometer (km).

F_{A} = Adjustment factor

H_{ET} = Effective height of terrain. Unit: meter (m).

=== Calculation of reference path loss ===
The reference path loss is usually computed along a 1 km or 1 mi link. Any other suitable length of path can be chosen based on the applications.

$L_0 = G_B + G_M + 20 \left( \log \lambda - \log d\right) - 22$

where,

G_{B} = Base station antenna gain. Unit: decibel with respect to isotropic antenna (dBi).

$\lambda$ = Wavelength. Unit: meter (m).

G_{M} = Mobile station antenna gain. Unit: decibel with respect to isotropic antenna (dBi).

=== Calculation of adjustment factors ===
The adjustment factor is calculated as:

$F_A = F_{BH} F_{BG} F_{MH} F_{MG} F_{F}$

where,

F_{BH} = Base station antenna height correction factor

F_{BG} = Base station antenna gain correction factor

F_{MH} = Mobile station antenna height correction factor

F_{MG} = Mobile station antenna gain correction factor

F_{F} = Frequency correction factor

=== The base station antenna height correction factor ===
$F_1 = \left(\frac{h_B} {30.48}\right)^2$

where,

h_{B} = Base station antenna height. Unit: meter.

=== The base station antenna gain correction factor ===
$F_2 = \frac{G_B}{4}$

where,

G_{B} = Base station antenna gain. Unit: decibel with respect to half-wave dipole (dBd).

=== The mobile station antenna height correction factor ===
$$F_3 = \begin{cases} \frac{h_M}{3} \qquad \text{ if, } h_M \le 3 \\ (\frac{h_M}{3})^2 \quad \text{ if, } h_M > 3 \end{cases}$$

where,

h_{M} = Mobile station antenna height. Unit: meter.

=== The mobile antenna gain correction factor ===
$F_4 = G_M$

where,

G_{M} = Mobile station antenna gain. Unit: decibel with respect to half wave dipole antenna (dBd).

=== The frequency correction factor ===
$F_5 = \left(\frac{f}{900}\right)^{-n} \text{ for } 2< n <3$

where,

f = Frequency. Unit: megahertz (MHz).

=== Effective terrain slope calculation ===
This is computed in the following way:

1. Extrapolate terrain slope at the mobile station to the base station.
2. Compute the vertical antenna height over the extrapolation line.

== See also ==
- Hata model
- Okumura model
- COST 231 model
- Young model
- Area-to-area Lee model
