= One woodland terminal model =

The ITU terrestrial model for one terminal in woodland is a radio propagation model belonging to the class of foliage models. This model is a successor of the early ITU model.

== Applicable to/under conditions ==
Applicable to the scenario where one terminal of a link is inside foliage and the other end is free.

== Coverage ==
Frequency: below 5 GHz
Depth of foliage: unspecified

== Mathematical formulation ==
The mathematical formulation of the model is:

$A_v\;=\;A\;[1\;-\;e^-{\frac{d \gamma}{A}}]$

Where,

A_{v} = Attenuation due to vegetation. Unit: decibel (dB)

A = Maximum attenuation for one terminal caused by a certain foliage. Unit: decibel (dB)

d = Depth of Foliage along the path. Unit: Meter(m)

$\gamma\;$ = Specific attenuation for short vegetations. Unit: decibel/meter (dB/m)

== Points to note ==
The value of $\gamma$ is dependent on frequency and is an empirical constant.

The model assumes that exactly one of the terminals is located inside some forest or plantation and the term depth applies to the distance from the terminal inside the plantation to the end of plantation along the link.

== See also ==
- Early ITU model
- Weissberger's model
- Single vegetative obstruction model
