= Herceg (surname) =

Herceg is a Croatian surname.

It is one of the most common surnames in the Krapina-Zagorje County of Croatia.

It is presumably derived from the title of Herceg.

People with the name include:

- Antun Herceg (born 1927), Serbian football player
- Danko Herceg (born 1974), Croatian canoeist
- Ivan Herceg (disambiguation), multiple people
- Mirko Herceg (born 1992), Bosnian handball player

== See also ==
- Erceg
