= SPLAT! =

SPLAT! (short for an RF Signal Propagation, Loss, And Terrain analysis tool) is a GNU GPL-licensed terrestrial radio propagation model application initially written for Linux but has since been ported for Windows and OS X. SPLAT! can use the Longley-Rice path loss and coverage prediction using the Irregular Terrain Model to predict the behaviour and reliability of radio links, and to predict path loss.

SRTM filenames refer to the latitude and longitude of the southwest corner of the topographic dataset contained within the file. Therefore, the region of interest must lie north and east of the latitude and longitude provided in the SRTM filename.

== History ==
Development started in 1997 by John A. Magliacane, KD2BD. The latest version 1.4.2 was published in 2014. In 2020 several authors started the development of a completely reworked version which was not published yet. The authors introduce multithreading, georeferenced outputs (GeoTIFF) and metrication as defaults.
