= RF planning =

In the context of mobile radio communication systems, RF planning is the process of assigning frequencies, transmitter locations and parameters to a wireless communications system to evaluate coverage and capacity. Coverage is the distance at which the RF signal has sufficient strength to sustain a call/data session. Capacity relates to the system data rate.

The RF Planning process consists of four major stages.

== Phase 1: initial radio link budgeting ==
A statistical propagation model (e.g. Hata, COST-231 Hata or Erceg-Greenstein) is used to approximate the coverage area of the planned sites and to eventually determine how many sites are required. The statistical propagation of the model does not include terrain effects and has a model for each type of environment (rural, urban, suburban, etc.). Two essential inputs at this level are simple radio transceiver characteristics and 'flat' map of the area. This fairly simplistic approach allows for a quick analysis of the number of sites that may be required to cover a certain area.

== Phase 2: detailed RF propagation modelling ==
The second level of the RF Planning process relies on a more detailed propagation model. Automatic planning tools are often employed in this phase to perform detailed predictions. The propagation model takes into account the characteristics of the selected antenna, the terrain, and the land use and land clutter surrounding each site. This requires precise and accurate characterization of every transceiver and detailed, three-dimensional model of the terrain. Since these factors are considered, this propagation model provides a better estimate of the coverage of the sites than the initial statistical propagation model. Thus, its use, in conjunction with the RF link budget, produces a more accurate determination of the number of sites required. Following is a typical list of outputs produced at this stage:

- Number of sites and site locations (and height)
- Antenna directions and downtilts
- Neighbour cell lists for each site
- Mobility (handover and cell re-selection) parameters for each site.
- Frequency plan
- Detailed coverage predictions (e.g. signal strength (RSRP), signal quality (RSRQ) best CINR, best server areas, uplink and downlink throughput)

== Phase 3: fine tuning and optimisation ==
The third phase of the RF planning process incorporates further detail into the RF plan. This stage includes items such as collecting drive data to be used to tune or calibrate the propagation prediction model, predicting the available data throughout each site, fine-tuning of parameter settings (e.g. antenna orientation, downtilting, frequency plan).

== Phase 4: continuous optimisation ==
The final phase of the RF planning process involves continuous optimisation of the RF plan to accommodate for changes in the environment or additional service requirements (e.g. additional coverage or capacity). This phase starts from initial network deployment and involves collecting measurement data on a regular basis which could be via drive testing or centralised collection. The data is then used to plan new sites or to optimize the parameter settings (e.g. antenna orientation, downtilting, frequency plan) of existing sites.

== See also ==
- Friis transmission equation
- Decibel
- Radiation pattern
- Multipath propagation
- Free space loss
- Network Simulator
