= Egli model =

The Egli model is a terrain model for radio frequency propagation. This model, which was first introduced by John Egli in his 1957 paper, was derived from real-world data on UHF and VHF television transmissions in several large cities. It predicts the total path loss for a point-to-point link. Typically used for outdoor line-of-sight transmission, this model provides the path loss as a single quantity.

== Applicable to/under conditions ==
The Egli model is typically suitable for cellular communication scenarios where one antenna is fixed and another is mobile. The model is applicable to scenarios where the transmission has to go over an irregular terrain. However, the model does not take into account travel through some vegetative obstruction, such as trees or shrubbery.

== Coverage ==
Frequency: The model is typically applied to VHF and UHF spectrum transmissions.

== Mathematical formulation ==
The Egli model is formally expressed as:

$P_ R= G_B G_M \left[\frac{h_B h_M}{d^2}\right] ^2 \left[{\frac{40} {f}}\right]^2 P_T$

Where,

$P_R$ = Receive power [W]

$P_T$ = Transmit power [W]

$G_B$ = Absolute gain of the base station antenna.

$G_M$ = Absolute gain of the mobile station antenna.

$h_B$ = Height of the base station antenna. [m]

$h_M$ = Height of the mobile station antenna. [m]

$d$ = Distance from base station antenna. [m]

$f$ = Frequency of transmission. [MHz]

== Limitations ==
This model predicts the path loss as a whole and does not subdivide the loss into free space loss and other losses.

== See also ==
- Longley–Rice model
- ITU terrain model
- International Telecommunication Union
