= Two-ray ground-reflection model =

Multipath radio propagation model

The two-rays ground-reflection model is a multipath radio propagation model which predicts the path losses between a transmitting antenna and a receiving antenna when they are in line of sight (LOS). Generally, the two antenna each have different height. The received signal having two distinct components, the LOS component and the reflection component formed predominantly by a single ground reflected wave.

- The 2-ray ground reflection model is a simplified propagation model used to estimate the path loss between a transmitter and a receiver in wireless communication systems, in order to estimate the actual communication paths used. It assumes that the signal propagates through two paths:

1) Direct Path: A direct line-of-sight path between the transmitter and receiver antennas. 2) Reflected path: The path through which the signal reflects off the ground before reaching the receiver.

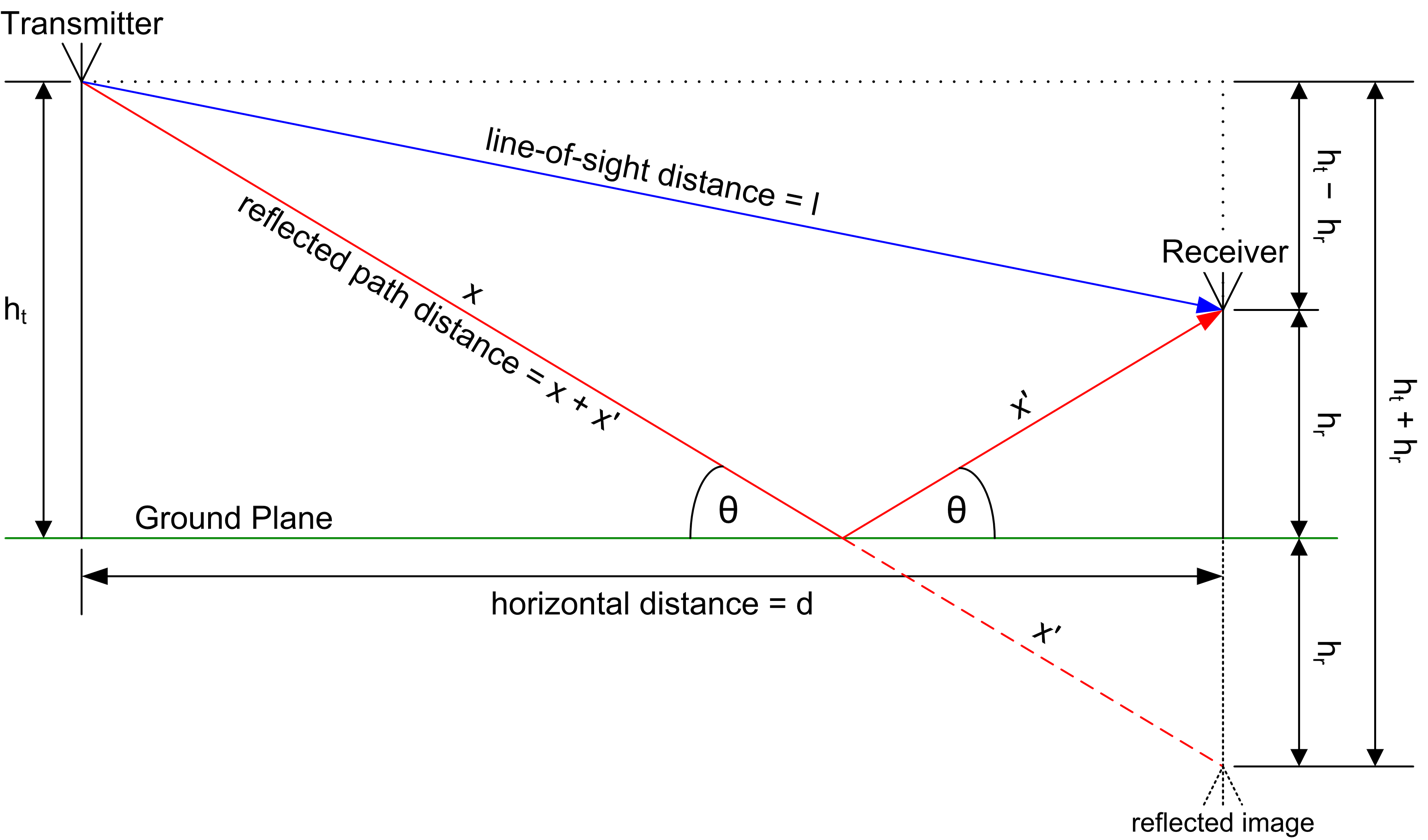
2-Ray Ground Reflection diagram including variables for the 2-ray ground reflection propagation algorithm.

== Mathematical derivation ==
From the figure the received line of sight component may be written as

$$r_{los}(t)=Re \left\{ \frac{ \lambda \sqrt{G_{los}} }{4\pi}\times \frac{s(t) e^{-j2\pi l/\lambda}}{l} \right\}$$

and the ground reflected component may be written as

$$r_{gr}(t)=Re\left\{\frac{\lambda \Gamma(\theta) \sqrt{G_{gr}}}{4\pi}\times \frac{s(t-\tau) e^{-j2\pi (x+x')/\lambda}}{x+x'} \right\}$$

where $s(t)$ is the transmitted signal, $l$ is the length of the direct line-of-sight (LOS) ray, $x + x'$ is the length of the ground-reflected ray, $G_{los}$ is the combined antenna gain along the LOS path, $G_{gr}$ is the combined antenna gain along the ground-reflected path, $\lambda$ is the wavelength of the transmission ($\lambda = \frac{c}{f}$, where $c$ is the speed of light and $f$ is the transmission frequency), $\Gamma(\theta)$ is ground reflection coefficient and $\tau$ is the delay spread of the model which equals $(x+x'-l)/c$. The ground reflection coefficient is

$$\Gamma(\theta)= \frac{\sin \theta - X}{\sin \theta + X }$$

where $X=X_h$ or $X=X_v$ depending if the signal is horizontal or vertical polarized, respectively. $X$ is computed as follows.

$$X_{h}=\sqrt{\varepsilon_{g}-{\cos}^2 \theta},\ X_{v}= \frac{\sqrt{\varepsilon_g-{\cos}^{2}\theta}}{\varepsilon_{g}} = \frac{X_h}{\varepsilon_g}$$

The constant $\varepsilon_g$ is the relative permittivity of the ground (or generally speaking, the material where the signal is being reflected), $\theta$ is the angle between the ground and the reflected ray as shown in the figure above.

From the geometry of the figure, yields:

$$x+x'=\sqrt{(h_t+h_r)^2 +d^2}$$

and

$$l=\sqrt{(h_t - h_r) ^2 +d^2}$$,

Therefore, the path-length difference between them is

$$\Delta d=x+x'-l=\sqrt{(h_t+h_r )^2 +d^2}-\sqrt{(h_t- h_r) ^2 +d^2}$$

and the phase difference between the waves is

$$\Delta \phi =\frac{2 \pi \Delta d}{\lambda}$$

The power of the signal received is

$$P_r = E\{|r_{los}(t) + r_{gr}(t)|^2 \}$$

where $E\{\cdot\}$ denotes average (over time) value.

=== Approximation ===
If the signal is narrow band relative to the inverse delay spread $1/\tau$, so that $s(t)\approx s(t-\tau)$, the power equation may be simplified to

$$\begin{align}
P_r= E\{|s(t)|^2\} \left( {\frac{\lambda}{4\pi}} \right) ^2 \times \left| \frac{\sqrt{G_{los}} \times e^{-j2\pi l/\lambda}}{l} + \Gamma(\theta) \sqrt{G_{gr}} \frac{e^{-j2\pi (x+x')/\lambda}}{x+x'} \right|^2&=P_t \left( {\frac{\lambda}{4\pi}} \right) ^2 \times \left| \frac{\sqrt{G_{los}}} {l} + \Gamma(\theta) \sqrt{G_{gr}} \frac{e^{-j \Delta \phi}}{x+x'} \right|^2
\end{align}$$

where $P_t= E\{|s(t)|^2\}$ is the transmitted power.

When distance between the antennas $d$ is very large relative to the height of the antenna we may expand $\Delta d = x+x'-l$,

$$\begin{align}
\Delta d = x+x'-l = d \Bigg(\sqrt{\frac{(h_t+h_r) ^2}{d^2}+1}-\sqrt{\frac{(h_t- h_r )^2 }{d^2}+1}\Bigg)
\end{align}$$

using the Taylor series of $\sqrt{1 + x}$:

$$\sqrt{1 + x} = 1 + \textstyle \frac{1}{2}x - \frac{1}{8}x^2 + \dots,$$

and taking the first two terms only,

$$x+x'-l \approx \frac{d}{2} \times \left( \frac{(h_t+ h_r )^2}{d^2} -\frac{(h_t- h_r )^2 }{d^2} \right) = \frac{2 h_t h_r }{d}$$

The phase difference can then be approximated as

$$\Delta \phi \approx \frac{4 \pi h_t h_r }{\lambda d}$$

When $d$ is large, $d \gg (h_t+h_r)$,

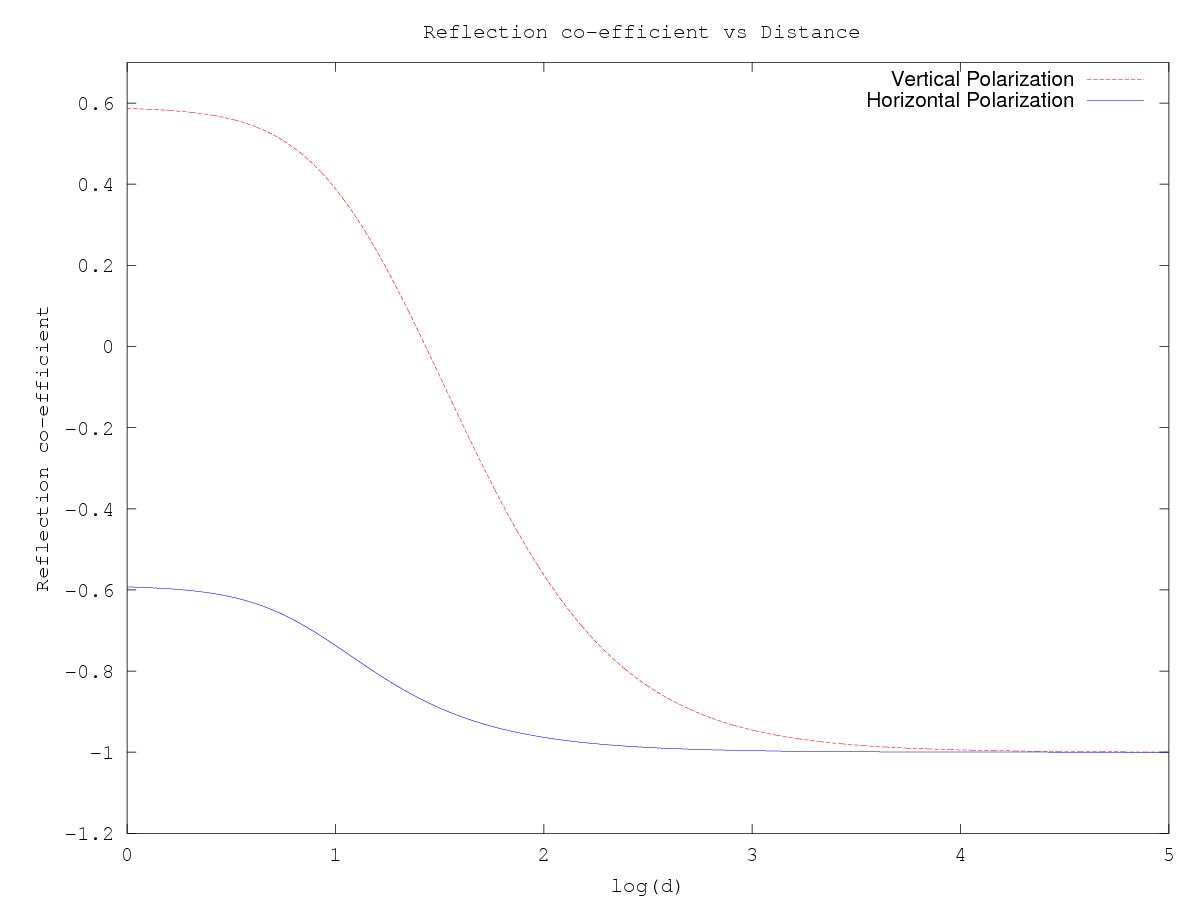
Reflection co-efficient tends to -1 for large d.

$$\begin{align}
d & \approx l \approx x+x',\ \Gamma(\theta) \approx -1,\ G_{los} \approx G_{gr} = G
\end{align}$$

and hence

$$P_r \approx P_t  \left( {\frac{\lambda \sqrt{G}}{4\pi d}} \right) ^2 \times | 1-e^{-j \Delta \phi}|^2$$

Expanding $e^{-j\Delta \phi}$using Taylor series

$$e^x = \sum_{n=0}^\infty \frac{x^n}{n!} = 1 + x + \frac{x^2}{2} + \frac{x^3}{6} + \cdots$$

and retaining only the first two terms

$$e^{-j\Delta \phi} \approx 1 + ({-j\Delta \phi}) + \cdots = 1 - j\Delta \phi$$

it follows that

$$\begin{align}
P_r & \approx P_t  \left( {\frac{\lambda \sqrt{G}}{4\pi d}} \right) ^2 \times |1 - (1 -j \Delta \phi) |^2 \\
& = P_t \left( {\frac{\lambda \sqrt{G}}{4\pi d}} \right) ^2 \times \Delta \phi^2 \\
& = P_t \left({\frac{\lambda \sqrt{G}}{4\pi d}} \right) ^2 \times \left(\frac{4 \pi h_t h_r }{\lambda d} \right)^2 \\
& = P_t \frac{G h_t ^2 h_r ^2}{d^4}
\end{align}$$

so that

$$P_r \approx P_t \frac{G h_t ^2 h_r ^2}{d^4}$$

and path loss is

$$PL=\frac{P_t}{P_r}=\frac{d^4}{Gh_t^2h_r^2}$$

which is accurate in the far field region, i.e. when $\Delta \phi \ll 1$ (angles are measured here in radians, not degrees) or, equivalently,

$$d \gg \frac{4 \pi h_t h_r }{\lambda}$$

and where the combined antenna gain is the product of the transmit and receive antenna gains, $G=G_t G_r$. This formula was first obtained by B.A. Vvedenskij.

Note that the power decreases with as the inverse fourth power of the distance in the far field, which is explained by the destructive combination of the direct and reflected paths, which are roughly of the same in magnitude and are 180 degrees different in phase. $G_t P_t$ is called "effective isotropic radiated power" (EIRP), which is the transmit power required to produce the same received power if the transmit antenna were isotropic.

== In logarithmic units ==
In logarithmic units : $P_{r_\text{dBm}}=P_{t_\text{dBm}}+ 10 \log_{10}(G h_t ^2 h_r ^2) - 40 \log_{10}(d)$

Path loss : $PL\;=P_{t_\text{dBm}}-P_{r_\text{dBm}}\;=40 \log_{10}(d)-10 \log_{10}(G h_t ^2 h_r ^2)$

== Power vs. distance characteristics ==
When the distance $d$ between antennas is less than the transmitting antenna height, two waves are added constructively to yield bigger power. As distance increases, these waves add up constructively and destructively, giving regions of up-fade and down-fade. As the distance increases beyond the critical distance $dc$ or first Fresnel zone, the power drops proportionally to an inverse of fourth power of $d$. An approximation to critical distance may be obtained by setting Δφ to π as the critical distance to a local maximum.

== An extension to large antenna heights ==
The above approximations are valid provided that $d \gg (h_t+h_r)$, which may be not the case in many scenarios, e.g. when antenna heights are not much smaller compared to the distance, or when the ground cannot be modelled as an ideal plane . In this case, one cannot use $\Gamma \approx -1$ and more refined analysis is required, see e.g.

== Propagation modeling for high-altitude platforms, UAVs, drones, etc. ==
The above large antenna height extension can be used for modeling a ground-to-the-air propagation channel as in the case of an airborne communication node, e.g. an UAV, drone, high-altitude platform. When the airborne node altitude is medium to high, the relationship $d \gg (h_t+h_r)$ does not hold anymore, the clearance angle is not small and, consequently, $\Gamma \approx -1$ does not hold either. This has a profound impact on the propagation path loss and typical fading depth and the fading margin required for the reliable communication (low outage probability).

== As a case of log distance path loss model ==
The standard expression of Log distance path loss model in [dB] is

$$PL\;=P_{T_{dBm}}-P_{R_{dBm}}\;=\;PL_0\;+\;10\nu\;\log_{10} \frac{d}{d_0}\;+\;X_g,$$

where $X_g$ is the large-scale (log-normal) fading, $d_0$ is a reference distance at which the path loss is $PL_0$, $\nu$ is the path loss exponent; typically $\nu = 2...4$. This model is particularly well-suited for measurements, whereby $PL_0$ and $\nu$ are determined experimentally; $d_0$ is selected for convenience of measurements and to have clear line-of-sight. This model is also a leading candidate for 5G and 6G systems and is also used for indoor communications, see e.g. and references therein.

The path loss [dB] of the 2-ray model is formally a special case with $\nu = 4$:

$$PL\;=P_{t_{dBm}}-P_{r_{dBm}}\;=40 \log_{10}(d)-10 \log_{10}(G h_t ^2 h_r ^2)$$

where $d_0=1$, $X_g = 0$, and

$$PL_0 =-10 \log_{10}(G h_t ^2 h_r ^2)$$,

which is valid the far field, $d > d_c = 4\pi h_r h_t/\lambda$ = the critical distance.

== As a case of multi-slope model ==
The 2-ray ground reflected model may be thought as a case of multi-slope model with break point at critical distance with slope 20 dB/decade before critical distance and slope of 40 dB/decade after the critical distance. Using the free-space and two-ray model above, the propagation path loss can be expressed as

$L =\max \{G, L_{min},L_{FS},L_{2-ray}\}$

where $L_{FS}=(4\pi d/\lambda)^2$ and $L_{2-ray}=d^4/(h_t h_r)^2$ are the free-space and 2-ray path losses; $L_{min}$ is a minimum path loss (at smallest distance), usually in practice; $L_{min} \approx 20$ dB or so. Note that $L \ge G$ and also $L \ge 1$ follow from the law of energy conservation (since the Rx power cannot exceed the Tx power) so that both $L_{FS}=(4\pi d/\lambda)^2$ and $L_{2-ray}=d^4/(h_t h_r)^2$ break down when $d$ is small enough. This should be kept in mind when using these approximations at small distances (ignoring this limitation sometimes produces absurd results).

== See also ==
- Path loss
- Radio propagation model
- Free-space path loss
- Friis transmission equation
- ITU-R P.525
- Link budget
- Ray tracing (physics)
- Reflection (physics)
- Specular reflection
- Six-rays model
- Ten-rays model
