= ITU model for indoor attenuation =

The ITU indoor propagation model, also known as ITU model for indoor attenuation, formally standardized in ITU-R Recommendation P.1238, is an empirical radio propagation model that estimates the path loss inside a room or a closed area inside a building delimited by walls of any form. Suitable for appliances designed for indoor use, this model approximates the total path loss an indoor link may experience.

== Applicable to/under conditions ==
Primarily applied in network dimensioning for Wi-Fi, indoor cell systems (picocells and femtocells), DECT, and IoT sensor networks, the model predicts the median transmission loss between a transmitter and receiver located within the same building. It accounts for distance, operating frequency, building environment (residential, office, or commercial), and penetration through intermediate floors.

== Coverage ==
Frequency: 900 MHz to 5.2 GHz

Floors: 1 to 3

== Mathematical formulations ==
=== The model ===
The ITU-R indoor path loss model is a modified log-distance path loss model. The site-general median path loss L is expressed as:

$L \; = \; 20 \; \log_{10} f \; + \; N \; \log_{10} d \; + \; P_f(n) \; - \; 28$

where,

L = total transmission path loss between transmitter and receiver (dB).
f = Transmission Frequency in megahertz (MHz).
d = Straight-line 3D distance between transmitter and receiver in metres.
N = The distance power loss coefficient (dimensionless).
n = Number of floors between the transmitter and receiver.
P_{f}(n) = the floor loss penetration factor (dB).

=== Calculation of distance power loss coefficient ===
The distance power loss coefficient, N is the quantity that expresses the loss of signal power with distance. This coefficient is an empirical one. Some values are provided in Table 1.

| Frequency band | Residential area | Office area | Commercial area |
|---|---|---|---|
| 900 MHz | N/A | 33 | 20 |
| 1.2–1.3 GHz | N/A | 32 | 22 |
| 1.8–2.0 GHz | 28 | 30 | 22 |
| 4 GHz | N/A | 28 | 22 |
| 5.2 GHz | 30 (apartment), 28 (house) | 31 | N/A |
| 5.8 GHz | N/A | 24 | N/A |
| 6.0 GHz | N/A | 22 | 17 |

=== Calculation of floor penetration loss factor ===
The floor penetration loss factor is an empirical constant dependent on the number of floors the waves need to penetrate. Some values are tabulated in Table 2.

| Frequency band | Number of floors | Residential area | Office area | Commercial area |
|---|---|---|---|---|
| 900 MHz | 1 | N/A | 9 | N/A |
| 900 MHz | 2 | N/A | 19 | N/A |
| 900 MHz | 3 | N/A | 24 | N/A |
| 1.8–2.0 GHz | n | 4n | 15+4(n-1) | 6 + 3(n-1) |
| 5.2 GHz | 1 | N/A | 16 | N/A |
| 5.8 GHz | 1 | N/A | 22 (1 floor), 28 (2 floors) | N/A |

== See also ==
- Log-distance path loss model
- Free-space path loss
- Radio propagation model
- Young model
