= ITU terrain model =

The ITU terrain loss model is a radio propagation model that provides a method to predict the median path loss for a telecommunication link. Developed on the basis of diffraction theory, this model predicts the path loss as a function of the height of path blockage and the First Fresnel zone for the transmission link.

== Applicable to / under conditions ==
This model is applicable on any terrain.

This model accounts for obstructions in the middle of the telecommunication link, and therefore, is suitable to be used inside cities as well as in open fields.

== Coverage ==
Frequency: Any

Distance: Any

== Mathematical formulation ==
The model is mathematically formulated as:

$$A \; = \; 10 \; - \; 20 \; C_N$$

$$C_N \; = \; \frac{h} {F_1}$$

$$h \; = \; h_L \; - \; h_O$$

$$F_1 \; = \; 17.3 \; \sqrt{\frac{d_1d_2}{fd}}$$

Where,

$A \;$ = Additional loss (in excess of free-space loss) due to diffraction (dB)

$C_N \;$ = Normalized terrain clearance

$h \;$ = The height difference (negative in the case that the LOS path is completely obscured) (m)

$h_L \;$ = Height of the line-of-sight link (m)

$h_O \;$ = Height of the obstruction (m)

$F_1 \;$ = Radius of the first Fresnel zone (m)

$d_1 \;$ = Distance of obstruction from one terminal (km)

$d_2 \;$ = Distance of obstruction from the other terminal (km)

$f \;$ = Frequency of transmission (GHz)

$d \;$ = Distance from transmitter to receiver (km)

To use the model, one computes the additional loss to each path obstruction (A). These losses are summed and then added to the predicted line of sight path loss which is calculated using Friis transmission equation or a similar theoretical or empirical model.

== Limitations ==
This model is considered valid for losses over 15 dB and may be valid for losses as low as 6 dB. In the event that the loss is less than 6 dB or is negative (i.e., gain), this A-value should be discarded.

This model's output is only as good as the data on which it is based and the LOS model it is used to correct.

== See also ==
- Egli model
- Radio propagation model
- Longley–Rice model
