= Single vegetative obstruction model =

The ITU single vegetative obstruction model is a radio propagation model that quantitatively estimates attenuation due to a single plant or tree standing in the middle of a telecommunication link.

== Coverage ==
Frequency = Below 3 GHz and over 5 GHz
Depth = Not specified

== Mathematical formulations ==
The single vegetative obstruction model is formally expressed as,

$$A = \begin{cases}d \gamma \mbox{  , frequency} < 3 GHz \\ R_fd \;+\;k[1-e^{(R_f - R_i)\frac{d}{k}}] \mbox{  , frequency} > 5 GHz \end{cases}$$

where, A = The Attenuation due to vegetation. Unit: decibel(dB).

d = Depth of foliage. Unit: Meter (m).

$\gamma$ = Specific attenuation for short vegetative paths. Unit: decibel per meter (dB/m).

R_{i} = The initial slope of the attenuation curve

R_{f} = The final slope of the attenuation curve

f = The frequency of operations. Unit: gigahertz (GHz).

k = Empirical constant

=== Calculation of slopes ===
Initial slope is calculated as:

$R_i\;=\;af$

And the final slope as:

$R_f\;=\;bf^c$

where,

a, b and c are empirical constants (given in the table below).

=== Calculation of k ===
k is computed as:

$k = k_0\;-\;10\;\log {[A_0\;(1\;-\;e^{\frac{-A^i}{A_0}})(1-e^{R_ff})]}$

where,

k_{0} = Empirical constant (given in the table below)

R_{f} = Empirical constant for frequency dependent attenuation

A_{0} = Empirical attenuation constant (given in the table below)

A_{i} = Illumination area

=== Calculation of A_{i} ===
A_{i} is calculated in using any of the equations below. A point to note is that, the terms h, h_{T}, h_{R}, w, w_{T} and w_{R} are defined perpendicular to the (assumed horizontal) line joining the transmitter and receiver. The first three terms are measured vertically and the other there are measured horizontally.

Equation 1: $A_i\;=\;min(w_T, w_R, w)\;x\;min(h_T, h_R, h)$

Equation 2: $A_i\;=\;min(2d_T\;\tan {\frac{a_T}{2}}, 2d_R \tan{\frac{a_R}{2}}, w)\;x\;min(2d_T \tan {\frac{e_T}{2}}, 2d_R \tan{\frac{e_R}{2}}, h)$

where,

w_{T} = Width of illuminated area as seen from the transmitter. Unit: meter (m).

w_{R} = Width of illuminated area as seen from the receiver. Unit: meter (m).

w = Width of the vegetation. Unit: meter (m).

h_{T} =Height of illuminated area as seen from the transmitter. Unit: meter (m).

h_{R} = Height of illuminated area as seen from the receiver. Unit: meter (m).

h = Height of the vegetation. Unit: meter (m).

a_{T} = Azimuth beamwidth of the transmitter. Unit: degree or radian.

a_{R} = Azimuth beamwidth of the receiver. Unit: degree or radian.

e_{T} = Elevation beamwidth of the transmitter. Unit: degree or radian.

e_{R} = Elevation beamwidth of the receiver. Unit: degree or radian.

d_{T} = Distance of the vegetation from transmitter. Unit: meter (m).

d_{R} = Distance of the vegetation from receiver. Unit: meter (m).

== The empirical constants ==
Empirical constants a, b, c, k_{0}, R_{f} and A_{0} are used as tabulated below.

Parameter	Inside leaves	Out of leaves
a	0.20	0.16
b	1.27	2.59
c	0.63	0.85
k_{0}	6.57	12.6
R_{f}	0.0002	2.1
A_{0}	10	10

== Limitations ==
The model predicts the explicit path loss due to the existence of vegetation along the link. The total path loss includes other factors like free space loss which is not included in this model.

Over 5 GHz, the equations suddenly become extremely complex in consideration of the equations for below 3 GHz. Also, this model does not work for frequency between 3 GHz and 5 GHz.

== See also ==
- Radio propagation model
- Weissberger's model
- Early ITU model
