= F2 propagation =

Ionospheric phenomenon

F2 propagation (F2-skip) is the reflection of VHF signals off the F2 layer of the ionosphere. The phenomenon is rare compared to other forms of propagation (such as sporadic E propagation, or E-skip) but can reflect signals thousands of miles beyond their intended broadcast area, substantially farther than E-skip. F2-skip affects the upper ends of the high frequency (HF) spectrum and the low ends of the very high frequency (VHF) spectrum; only a small portion of F2's effective range overlaps frequencies used by consumer broadcast reception, also contributing to the phenomenon being rarely encountered.

== Theory ==
Solar activity has a cycle of approximately 11 years. During this period, sunspot activity rises to a peak and gradually falls again to a low level. When sunspot activity increases, the reflecting capabilities of the F1 layer surrounding earth enable high frequency short-wave communications. The highest-reflecting layer, the F2 layer, which is approximately 200 miles (320 km) above earth, receives ultraviolet radiation from the sun, causing ionisation of the gases within this layer. During the daytime when sunspot activity is at a maximum, the F2 layer can become intensely ionized due to radiation from the sun. When solar activity is sufficiently high, the maximum usable frequency (MUF) increases, hence the ionisation density is sufficient to reflect signals well into the 30-60 MHz VHF spectrum. Since the MUF progressively increases, F2 reception on lower frequencies can indicate potential low band 45-55 MHz VHF TV as well as VHF amateur radio paths. A rising MUF will initially affect the 27 MHz CB band, and the amateur 28 MHz 10 meters band before reaching 45-55 MHz TV and the 6 meters amateur band. The F2 MUF generally increases at a slower rate compared to the Es MUF.

Since the height of the F2 layer is some 200 miles (320 km), it follows that single-hop F2 signals will be received at thousands rather than hundreds of miles. A single-hop F2 signal will usually be around 2,000 miles (3,200 km) minimum. A maximum F2 single-hop can reach up to approximately 3,000 miles (4,800 km). Multi-hop F2 propagation has enabled Band 1 VHF reception to over 11,000 miles (18,000 km).

Since F2 reception is directly related to radiation from the Sun on both a daily basis and in relation to the sunspot cycle, it follows that for optimum reception the centre of the signal path will be roughly at midday. Outside a solar maximum it can still occur somewhat regularly within about 15 to 20 degrees from the geomagnetic equator, with the peak generally being in spring time. However, this type of F2 propagation is mostly specifically referred to as TEP (Trans Equatorial Propagation) to differentiate it from the less common mid latitude F2 propagation.

The F2 layer tends to predominantly propagate signals below 30 MHz (HF) during a solar minimum, which includes the 27 MHz CB radio, and 28 MHz 10-meter amateur radio band. During a solar maximum, television, amateur radio signals, private land mobile, and other services in the 30-60 MHz VHF spectrum are also propagated over considerable distances. In North America, F2 is most likely to only affect VHF TV channel 2, in Europe and middle east channel E2 and E3 (and the now deprecated channel itA) and in eastern Europe channel R1.

Television pictures propagated via F2 tend to suffer from characteristic ghosting and smearing, although they are mostly stronger and more stable than double hop Sporadic E signal. Picture degradation and signal strength attenuation increases with each subsequent F2 hop.

== Notable F2 DX receptions ==
- In November 1938, 405-line video from the BBC Alexandra Palace television station (London, England) on channel B1 (45.0 MHz) was received in New York, US.
- In 1958, the FM broadcast radio DX record was set by DXer Gordon Simkin in southern California, United States, when he logged a 45 MHz commercial FM station from Korea via trans-Pacific F2 propagation at a distance of 5,000 miles (8,000 km).
- In October 1979, Anthony Mann (Perth, Western Australia) received 48.25 MHz audio and 51.75 MHz video from the Holme Moss BBC channel B2 television transmitter. This F2 reception is a world record for reception from a BBC 405-line channel B2 transmitter.
- During October to December 1979, United Kingdom DXers Roger Bunney (Hampshire), Hugh Cocks (Sussex), Mike Allmark (Leeds), and Ray Davies (Norwich) all received viewable television pictures from Australian channel TVQ 0 Brisbane (46.26 MHz) via multi-hop F2 propagation.
- On January 31, 1981, Todd Emslie, Sydney, Australia, received 41.5 MHz channel B1 television audio transmitted from Crystal Palace Transmitter by the BBC's television service, 10,560 miles (16,990 km) away. This BBC B1 reception was also recorded on to audio tape. He has also received Dubai's DCRTV 48.25 MHz video on November 23, 1991, in the same place.
- On February 8, 1992, emedxer from Perth, West Australia, received ARD E2 video from Grünten on 48.2604 MHz at a distance of 13,750 km away.
- On April 18, 2014, the DXer HughTVDX, received Canal 2 Posada (Misiones) - Argentina (55.251 MHz video) in southern Portugal about 8700 km away
- From late March until mid April 2023 Dante's Enigmatic World received various TV signals from the Philippines, such as AMBS ALLTV and TV5 A2 with video and audio (55.25 MHz video, 59.75 MHz audio) in Kyoto, Japan 3,200 km away.
- On August 27 2026 at around 1200 UTC there was an evening TEP opening from Japan to Darwin, Australia that included the Japanese FM band. Notable transmitters received include 76.1 Fukuoka, 79.3 NHK Tanegashima island and 85.6 NHK Kagoshima. The receiver in question was a TEF 6686 based tuner controlled remotely online. The distances involved were from 4500 to 5100 km.

== See also ==
- Tropospheric propagation
- Federal Standard 1037C
- MW DX
- Skywave
- Radio propagation
- Clear-channel station
