= Early ITU model =

The ITU vegetation model is a radio propagation model that estimates the path loss encountered due to the presence of one or more trees inside a point to point telecommunication link. The predictions found from this model is congruent to those found from Weissberger's modified exponential decay model in low frequencies.

== History ==
The CCIR, predecessor of ITU, adopted this model in the late 1986.

== Applicable to/under conditions ==
- This model is applicable on the situations where the telecommunication link has some obstructions made by trees along its way
- This model is suitable for point-to-point microwave links that has a vegetation in their path.
- Typical application of this model is to predict the path loss for microwave links.

== Coverage ==
Frequency: Not specified

Depth of Foliage: Not specified

== Mathematical formulation ==
The model is formulated as:

$L = 0.2 \, f^{0.3} \, d^{0.6}$

Where

L = The path loss. Unit: decibel (dB)
f = The frequency of transmission. Unit: megahertz (MHz)
d = The depth of foliage along the link: Unit: meter (m)

== Points to note ==
This equation is scaled for frequency specified in megahertz (MHz).

The depth of foliage must be in the units of meters.

== Limitations ==
The results of this model gets impractical at high frequencies.

== See also ==
- Radio propagation model
