= COST Hata model =

Radio propagation model

The COST Hata model is a radio propagation model (i.e. path loss) that extends the urban Hata model (which in turn is based on the Okumura model) to cover a more elaborated range of frequencies (up to 2 GHz). It is the most often cited of the COST 231 models (EU funded research project ca. April 1986 – April 1996), also called the Hata Model PCS Extension. This model is the combination of empirical and deterministic models for estimating path loss in an urban area over frequency range of 800 MHz to 2000 MHz.

COST (COopération européenne dans le domaine de la recherche Scientifique et Technique) is a European Union Forum for cooperative scientific research which has developed this model based on experimental measurements in multiple cities across Europe.

== Applicable to / under conditions ==
This model is applicable to macro cells in urban areas. To further evaluate Path Loss in suburban or rural (quasi-)open areas, this path loss has to be substituted into Urban to Rural / Urban to Suburban Conversions. (Ray GAO, 09 Sep 2007)

== Coverage ==
- Frequency: 1500–2000 MHz
- Mobile station antenna height: 1–10 m
- Base station antenna height: 30–200 m
- Link distance: 1–20 km

== Mathematical formulation ==
The COST Hata model is formulated as,

$L_b = 46.3 + 33.9 \log_{10} \frac{f}\text{MHz} - 13.82 \log_{10} \frac{h_B}\text{m} - a(h_R, f) + \left( 44.9 - 6.55 \log_{10} \frac{h_B}\text{m} \right) \log_{10} \frac{d}\text{km} + C_m$

where,

$L_b$
Median path loss. Unit: decibel (dB)
$f$
Frequency of Transmission. Unit: megahertz (MHz)
$h_B$
Base station antenna effective height. Unit: meter (m)
$d$
Link distance. Unit: Kilometer (km)
$h_R$
Mobile station antenna effective height. Unit: meter (m)
$a(h_R, f)$
Mobile station antenna height correction factor as described in the Hata model for urban areas.

For suburban or rural environments this factor is defined as,

$a(h_R,f) = \left( 1.1 \log_{10} \frac{f}\text{MHz} - 0.7 \right) \frac{h_R}\text{m} - \left( 1.56 \log_{10} \frac{f}\text{MHz} - 0.8 \right)$

and, for urban environments (i.e. large cities) as,

$$a(h_R,f) = \begin{cases}8.29 (\log_{10} ({1.54 h_R}))^2 - 1.1 &,\text{if } 150 \le f \le 200 \\ 3.2 \left( \log_{10} \left( {11.75 h_R} \right) \right)^2 - 4.97 &,\text{if } 200 < f \le 1500\end{cases}$$

$C_m$
Constant offset. Unit: decibel (dB). Defined as,

$$C_m = \begin{cases} 0\ dB \quad \text{for medium cities and suburban areas} \\ 3\ dB \quad \text{for metropolitan areas} \end{cases}$$

== Limitations ==
This model requires that the base station antenna is higher than all adjacent rooftops.

== See also ==
- Hata model
- Radio propagation model
