= Thermal fade =

A thermal fade is a phenomenon of Wireless signal degradation (fading) caused by temperature and relative humidity factors. As the prevailing environmental conditions change (e.g., from hot to cool, humid to arid, or day to night), the electromagnetic waves refract differently, thus altering the power distribution and possibly the direction of the signal. This is the same process that causes visible light to "bend" over a heated road or other surfaces on hot days.

Thermal fade primarily affects very and ultra high frequencies, regardless of modulation method (AM, FM, etc.). The thermal fade margin is calculated from subtracting losses from antenna gains. A higher fade margin is required in humid locations, and lower in dry ones.

== See also ==
- Atmospheric duct
- Refractive index
- Thermal degradation of polymers - sometimes referred to as "thermal fade".
