= Coherence bandwidth =

Statistical measurement in telecommunications

Coherence bandwidth is a statistical measurement of the range of frequencies over which the channel can be considered "flat", or in other words the approximate maximum bandwidth or frequency interval over which two frequencies of a signal are likely to experience comparable or correlated amplitude fading. If the multipath time delay spread equals D seconds, then the coherence bandwidth $W_c$ in rad/s is given approximately by the equation:

$$W_c \approx {2 \pi \over \ D}$$

Also, coherence bandwidth $B_c$ in Hz is given approximately by the equation:

$$B_c \approx {1 \over \ D}$$

It can be reasonably assumed that the channel is flat if the coherence bandwidth is greater than the data signal bandwidth. The coherence bandwidth varies over cellular or PCS communications paths because the multipath spread D varies from path to path.

== Application ==
Frequencies within a coherence bandwidth of one another tend to all fade in a similar or correlated fashion. One reason for designing the CDMA IS-95 waveform with a bandwidth of approximately 1.25 MHz is because in many urban signaling environments, the coherence bandwidth B_{c} is significantly less than 1.25 MHz. Therefore, when fading occurs, it occurs only over a relatively small fraction of the total CDMA signal bandwidth. The portion of the signal bandwidth over which fading does not occur typically contains enough signal power to sustain reliable communications. This is the bandwidth over which the channel transfer function remains virtually constant.

== Example ==
If the delay spread D over a particular cellular communication path in an urban environment is 1.9 μs, then using equation above, the coherence bandwidth is approximately 0.53 MHz, which results in frequency selective fading over the IS-95 bandwidth.

== See also ==
- Coherence time
- Coherence length
