= Ground conductivity =

Map of ground conducitivity over the continential United States

Ground conductivity refers to the electrical conductivity of the subsurface of the earth. In the International System of Units (SI) it is measured in millisiemens per meter (mS/m).

== Radio propagation ==
Ground conductivity is an extremely important factor in determining the field strength and propagation of surface wave (ground wave) radio transmissions. Low frequency (30–300 kHz) and medium frequency (300–3000 kHz) radio transmissions are particularly reliant on good ground conductivity as their primary propagation is by surface wave. It also affects the real world radiation pattern of high frequency (3-30 MHz) antennas, as the so-called "takeoff angle" is not an inherent property of the antenna but a result of a ground reflection. For this reason ITU publishes an extensive world atlas of ground conductivities.

== Other uses ==
Ground conductivity is sometimes used in determining the efficiency of a septic tank, using electromagnetic induction, so that contaminants do not reach the surface or nearby water supplies.
