= VOACAP =

Radio propagation model

VOACAP (Voice of America Coverage Analysis Program) is a radio propagation model that uses empirical data to predict the point-to-point path loss and coverage of a given transceiver if given as inputs: two antennas (configuration and position), solar weather, and time/date. Written in Fortran, it was originally designed for Voice of America.

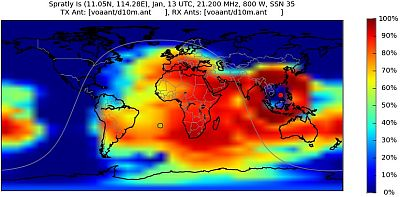
VOACAP HF coverage prediction

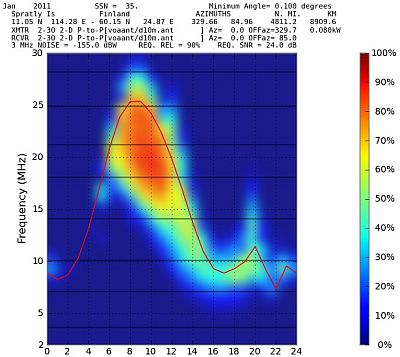
VOACAP HF propagation prediction

Some movies on the coverage during daytime can be found here.

== Simulating HF propagation conditions ==
Currently versions based on the original source tree exist for Windows, Linux (voacapl) and OSX. The program core uses text files for I/O and a bunch of wrappers now exist.

Besides commercial visualization tools, there are also Open Source implementations with GUI:

- VOACAP online using ITS' IONCAP model, available at http://www.voacap.com/prediction.html
- the PropagationPython Project. a.k.a. "Proppy" which is an evolution and alternate to VOACAP using the new ITURHFProp prediction model (formerly REC533) and always in development by James Watson

For immediate results, VOACAP provides a web interface for both the coverage and the prediction.

== See also ==
- Shortwave
- Radio propagation model
- Radio propagation
