= Power delay profile =

The power delay profile (PDP) gives the intensity of a signal received through a multipath channel as a function of time delay. The time delay is the difference in travel time between multipath arrivals. The abscissa is in units of time and the ordinate is usually in decibels. It is easily measured empirically and can be used to extract certain channels' parameters such as the delay spread.

For Small Scale channel modeling, the power delay profile of the channel is found by taking the spatial average of the channel's baseband impulse response i.e. $|h_{b}(t, \tau)|^{2}$ over a local area.
