= Coherence time (communications systems) =

Duration a communication channel's impulse response is effectively constant

In communications systems, a communication channel may change with time. Coherence time is the time duration over which the channel impulse response is considered to be not varying. Such channel variation is much more significant in Wireless communications systems, due to Doppler effects.

== Simple model ==
In a simple model, a signal $x(t)$ transmitted at time $t_1$ will be received as

$$y_{t_1}(t) = x(t-t_1)*h_{t_1}(t),$$

where $h_{t_1}(t)$ is the channel impulse response (CIR) at time $t_1$. A signal transmitted at time $t_2$ will be received as

$$y_{t_2}(t) = x(t-t_2)*h_{t_2}(t).$$

Now, if $h_{t_1}(t) - h_{t_2}(t)$ is relatively small, the channel may be considered constant within the interval $t_1$ to $t_2$.

Coherence time ($T_c$) will therefore be given by

$$T_c = t_2 - t_1.$$

== Relation with Doppler frequency ==
Coherence time $T_c$ is the time-domain dual of Doppler spread and is used to characterize the time-varying nature of the frequency dispersiveness of the channel in the time domain. The maximum Doppler spread and coherence time are inversely proportional to one another. That is, $T_c\approx\frac{1}{f_m}$ where $(f_m)$ is the maximum Doppler spread or, maximum Doppler frequency or, maximum Doppler shift given by $f_m=\frac{v}{c}f_c * 2$ with $f_c$ being the center frequency of the emitter.

Coherence time is actually a statistical measure of the time duration over which the channel impulse response is essentially invariant, and quantifies the similarity of the channel response at different times. In other words, coherence time is the time duration over which two received signals have a strong potential for amplitude correlation. If the reciprocal bandwidth of the baseband signal is greater than the coherence time of the channel, then the channel will change during the transmission of the baseband message, thus causing distortion at the receiver. If the coherence time is defined as the time over which the time correlation function is above 0.5, then the coherence time is approximately,

$$T_c\approx\frac{9}{16\pi f_m}$$

In practice, the first approximation of coherence time suggests a time duration during which a Rayleigh fading signal may fluctuate wildly, and the second approximation is often too restrictive. A popular rule of thumb for modern digital communications is to define the coherence time as the geometric mean of the two approximate values, also known as Clarke's model; from the maximum Doppler frequency $f_m$ we can obtain 50% coherence time

$$T_c=\sqrt{\frac{9}{16\pi f_m^2}}$$

Usually, we use the following relation

$$T_c=\sqrt{\frac{9}{16\pi}}\frac{1}{f_m}\simeq\frac{0.423}{f_m}$$
