= Magneto-ionic double refraction =

In telecommunications, magneto-ionic double refraction is the combined effect of the Earth's magnetic field and atmospheric ionization, whereby a linearly polarized wave entering the ionosphere is split into two components called the ordinary wave and extraordinary wave.

The component waves follow different paths, experience different attenuations, have different phase velocities, and, in general, are elliptically polarized in opposite senses. The critical frequency of the extraordinary wave is always greater than the critical frequency of the ordinary wave (i.e. the wave in absence of the magnetic field) by the amount approximately equal to .5 times of gyro frequency . The amplitude of extraordinary wave is dependent on the earth magnetic field at that particular point . Beside splitting, the polarization of the incident radio wave is also effected by this phenomenon because the electron that were earlier in simple harmonic motion only are now in spiral motion too due to the magnetic field.
