= Erceg =

Erceg is a Croatian and Serbian surname. Notable people with the surname include:

- Abby Erceg (born 1989), New Zealand women's international football player
- Filip Erceg (born 1979), Croatian writer and political activist
- Lucas Erceg (born 1995), American baseball player
- Michael Erceg (1956–2005), New Zealand businessman
- Oste Erceg (1947–2025), Bosnian Serb painter
- Percy Erceg (1928–2019), New Zealand rugby union player and coach
- Steve Erceg (born 1995), Australian professional mixed martial artist
- Stipe Erceg (born 1974), Croatian-German actor
- Tina Erceg (born 1988), Croatian gymnast
- Tomislav Erceg (born 1971), Croatian football player

== See also ==
- Herceg (surname)
