= Ivan Herceg =

Ivan Herceg may refer to:

- Ivan Herceg (actor)
- Ivan Herceg (footballer)

== See also ==
- Iván Herczeg, sprint canoeist
