= Fading distribution =

Probability distribution

Fading distribution is the probability distribution of the value of signal fading, relative to a specified reference level.

In the case of phase interference fading, the time distribution of the instantaneous field strength usually approximates a Rayleigh distribution when several signal components of equal amplitude are present.

The field strength is usually measured in volts per meter.

The fading distribution may also be measured in terms of power level, where the unit of measure is usually watts per square meter and the expression is in decibels.
