= Delay spread =

In telecommunications, the delay spread is a measure of the multipath richness of a communications channel. In general, it can be interpreted as the difference between the time of arrival of the earliest significant multipath component (typically the line-of-sight component) and the time of arrival of the last multipath components. The delay spread is mostly used in the characterization of wireless channels, but it also applies to any other multipath channel (e.g. multipath in optical fibers).

Delay spread can be quantified through different metrics, although the most common one is the root mean square (rms) delay spread. Denoting the power delay profile of the channel by $A_c(\tau)$, the mean delay of the channel is

$$\overline{\tau}=\frac{\int_0^\infty\tau A_c(\tau)d\tau}{\int_0^\infty A_c(\tau)d\tau}$$

and the rms delay spread is given by

$$\tau_{\text{rms}}=\sqrt{\frac{\int_0^\infty(\tau-\overline{\tau})^2  A_c(\tau)d\tau}{\int_0^\infty A_c(\tau)d\tau}}$$

The formula above is also known as the root of the second central moment of the normalised delay power density spectrum.

The importance of delay spread is how it affects the Inter Symbol Interference (ISI). If the symbol duration is long enough compared to the delay spread (typically 10 times as big would be good enough), one can expect an equivalent ISI-free channel. The correspondence with the frequency domain is the notion of coherence bandwidth (CB), which is the bandwidth over which the channel can be assumed flat (i.e. channel that passes all spectral components with approximately equal gain and linear phase.). Coherence bandwidth is related to the inverse of the delay spread. The shorter the delay spread, the larger is the coherence bandwidth. Delay spread has a significant impact on Intersymbol interference.
