= Fade margin =

In telecommunications, the term fade margin (fading margin) has the following meanings:

- A design allowance that provides for sufficient system gain or sensitivity to accommodate expected fading, for the purpose of ensuring that the required quality of service is maintained.
- The amount by which a received signal level may be reduced without causing system performance to fall below a specified threshold value. It is mainly used to describe a communication system such as satellite, for example a system like globalstar operates at 25-35 dB Fade margin.

== See also ==
- Multipath propagation
- Link Budget
