= Young model =

Cellular Communications systems

Young model is a radio propagation model that was built on the data collected on New York City. It typically models the behaviour of cellular communication systems in large cities.

== Applicable to/under conditions ==
This model is ideal for modeling the behaviour of cellular communications in large cities with tall structures.

== Coverage ==
Frequency: 150 MHz to 3700 MHz

== History ==
Young model was built on the data of 1952 in New York City.

== Mathematical formulation ==
The mathematical formulation for Young model is:

$L \; = \; G_B \; G_M \; \left (\frac{h_B \; h_M}{d^2} \right )^2\beta$

Where,

L = path loss. Unit: decibel (dB)
G_{B} = gain of base transmitter. Unit: decibel (dB)
G_{M} = gain of mobile transmitter. Unit: decibel (dB)
h_{B} = height of base station antenna. Unit: meter (m)
h_{M} = height of mobile station antenna. Unit: meter (m)
d = link distance. Unit: kilometer (km)
$\beta$ = clutter factor

== See also ==
- Hata model
- Log-distance path loss model
