= Okumura model =

The Okumura model is a radio propagation model that was built using data collected in the city of Tokyo, Japan. The model is ideal for using in cities with many urban structures but not many tall blocking structures. The model served as a base for the Hata model.

The Okumura model was built into three modes: for urban, suburban and open areas. The model for urban areas was built first, and used as the base for the others.

== Coverage ==
- Frequency: 150–1920 MHz
- Mobile station antenna height: between 1 m and 3 m
- Base station antenna height: between 30 m and 100 m
- Link distance: between 1 km and 100 km

== Mathematical formulation ==
The Okumura model is formally expressed as:

$L\;=\;L_\text{FSL}\;+\;A_\text{MU}\;-\;H_\text{MG}\;-\;H_\text{BG}\;-\;\sum{K_\text{correction}}\;$

where,

L = The median path loss. Unit: decibel (dB)

L_{FSL} = The free space loss. Unit: decibel (dB).

A_{MU} = Median attenuation. Unit: decibel (dB).

H_{MG} = Mobile station antenna height gain factor

H_{BG} = Base station antenna height gain factor

K_{correction} = Correction factor gain (such as type of environment, water surfaces, isolated obstacle etc.)

== Points to note ==
Okumura's model is one of the most widely used models for signal prediction in urban areas. This model is applicable for frequencies in the range 150–1920 MHz (although it is typically extrapolated up to 3000 MHz) and distances of 1–100 km. It can be used for base-station antenna heights ranging from 30–1000 m.

Okumura developed a set of curves giving the median attenuation relative to free space (A_{mu}), in an urban area over a quasi-smooth terrain with a base station effective antenna height (hte) of 200 m and a mobile antenna height (hre) of 3 m. These curves were developed from extensive measurements using vertical omni-directional antennas at both the base and mobile, and are plotted as a function of frequency in the range 100–1920 MHz and as a function of distance from the base station in the range 1–100 km. To determine path loss using Okumura's model, the free space path loss between the points of interest is first determined, and then the value of A_{mu}(f, d) (as read from the curves) is added to it along with correction factors to account for the type of terrain. The model can be expressed as:

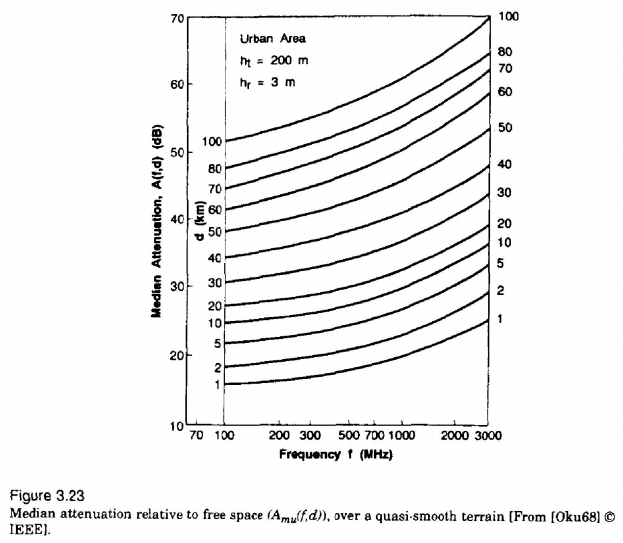

$L_{50\%}(dB) = LF + A_{mu}(f, d) - G(h_{te}) - G(h_{re}) - G_{area}$

where L50 is the 50th percentile (i.e., median) value of propagation path loss, LF is the free space propagation loss, A_{mu} is the median attenuation relative to free space, G(hte) is the base station antenna height gain factor, G(hre) is the mobile antenna height gain factor, and G_{AREA} is the gain due to the type of environment. Note that the antenna height gains are strictly a function of height and have nothing to do with antenna patterns.

Plots of A_{mu}(f, d) and G_{AREA} for a wide range of frequencies are shown in Figure 3,23 and Figure 3.24. Furthermore, Okumura found that G(h_{te}) varies at a rate of 20 dB/decade and G(h_{re}) varies at a rate of 10 dB/decade for heights less than 3 m. $G(h_{te}) = 20 \log \frac{h_{te}}{200}$ $1000m > h_{te} > 30m$

$G(h_{re}) = 10 \log \frac{h_{re}}{3}$ $h_{re} \le 3m$

$G(h_{re}) = 20 \log \frac{h_{re}}{3}$ $10m > h_{re} > 3m$

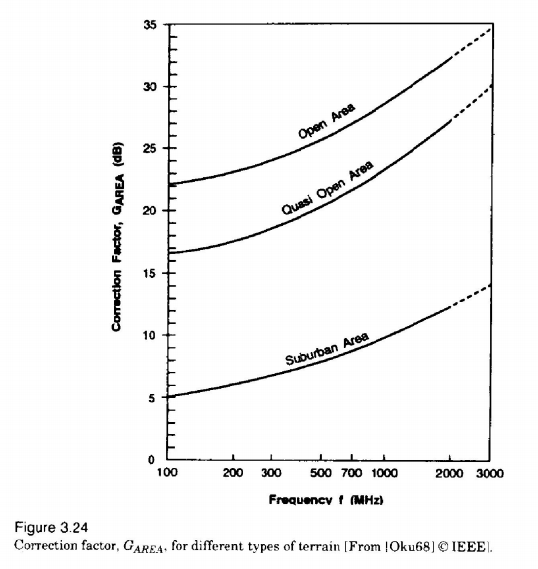

Other corrections may also be applied to Okumura's model. Some of the important terrain related parameters are the terrain undulation height (A/i), isolated ridge height, average slope of the terrain and the mixed land-sea parameter. Once the terrain related parameters are calculated, the necessary correction factors can be added or subtracted as required. All these correction factors are also available as Okumura curves [0ku68].

In irregular terrain, one frequently encounters non-line-of-sight paths caused by terrain obstacles. Okumura's model includes a correction factor called the "Isolated Ridge" factor to account for obstacles. However, the applicability of this correction is only to obstacles conforming to that description; i.e. an isolated ridge. More complex terrain cannot be modeled by the Isolated Ridge correction factor. A number of more general models exist for calculating diffraction loss. However, none of these can be applied directly to Okumura's basic mean attenuation. Proprietary methods of doing so have been developed; however, none are known to be in the public domain.

Okumura's model is wholly based on measured data and does not provide any analytical explanation. For many situations, extrapolations of the derived curves can be made to obtain values outside the measurement range, although the validity of such extrapolations depends on the circumstances and the smoothness of the curve in question.

Okumura's model is considered to be among the simplest and best in terms of accuracy in path loss prediction for mature cellular and land mobile radio systems in cluttered environments. It is very practical and has become a standard for system planning in modern land mobile radio systems in Japan. The major disadvantage with the model is its slow response to rapid changes in terrain, therefore the model is fairly good in urban and suburban areas, but not as good in rural areas. Common standard deviations between predicted and measured path loss values are around 10 dB to 14 dB.

== See also ==
- Hata model
- Young model
- Yoshihisa Okumura
