= Fading =

Term in wireless communications

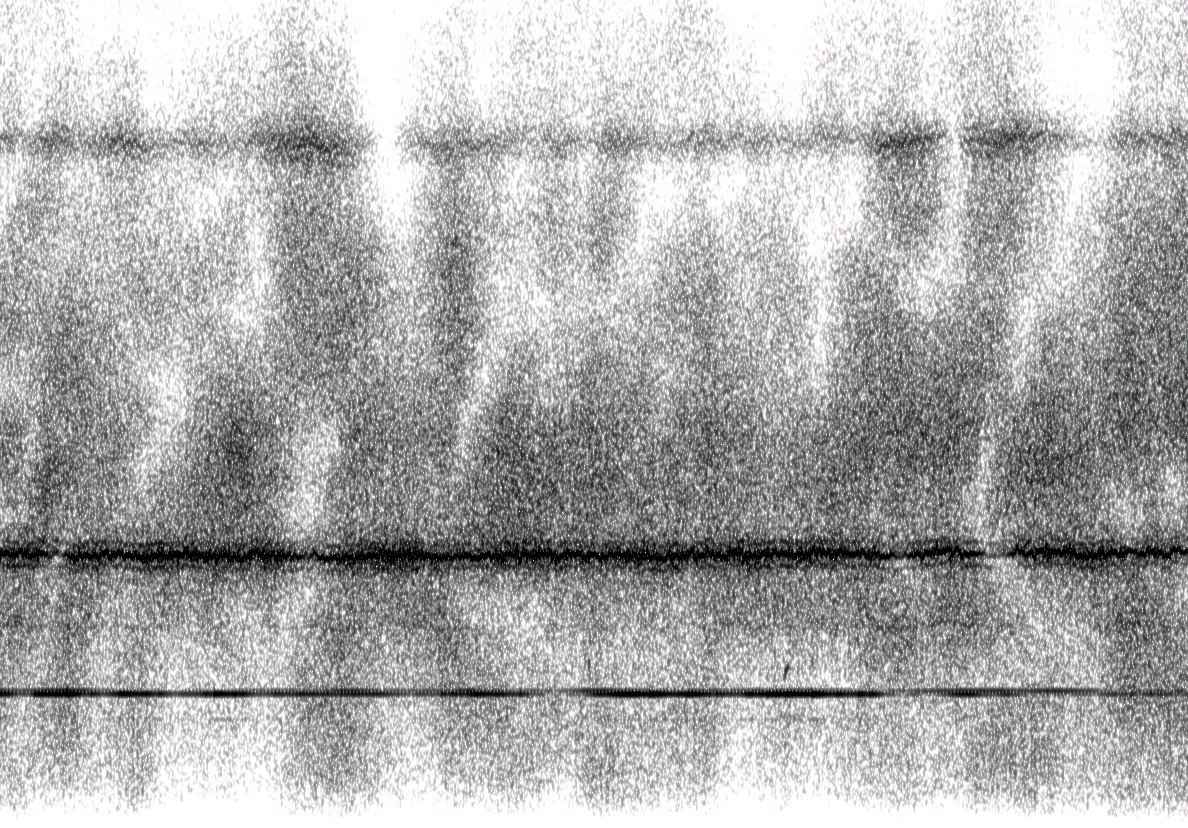
Frequency-selective time-varying fading causes a cloudy pattern to appear on a spectrogram. Time is shown on the horizontal axis, frequency on the vertical axis and signal strength as grey-scale intensity.

In wireless communications, fading is the variation of signal attenuation over variables like time, geographical position, and radio frequency. Fading is often modeled as a random process. In wireless systems, fading may either be due to multipath propagation, referred to as multipath-induced fading, weather (particularly rain), or shadowing from obstacles affecting the wave propagation, sometimes referred to as shadow fading.

A fading channel is a communication channel that experiences fading.

== Key concepts ==
The presence of reflectors in the environment surrounding a transmitter and receiver create multiple paths that a transmitted signal can traverse. As a result, the receiver sees the superposition of multiple copies of the transmitted signal, each traversing a different path. Each signal copy will experience differences in attenuation, delay and phase shift while traveling from the source to the receiver. This can result in either constructive or destructive interference, which amplifies or attenuates the signal power seen at the receiver. Strong destructive interference is frequently referred to as a deep fade and may result in temporary failure of communication due to a severe drop in the channel signal-to-noise ratio.

A common example of deep fade is the experience of stopping at a traffic light and hearing an FM broadcast degenerate into static, while the signal is re-acquired if the vehicle moves only a fraction of a meter. The loss of the broadcast is caused by the vehicle stopping at a point where the signal experienced severe destructive interference. Cellular phones can also exhibit similar momentary fades.

Fading channel models are often used to model the effects of electromagnetic transmission of information over the air in cellular networks and broadcast communication. Fading channel models are also used in underwater acoustic communications to model the distortion caused by the water.

== Types ==
=== Slow versus fast fading ===
The terms slow and fast fading refer to the rate at which the magnitude and phase change imposed by the channel on the signal changes. The coherence time is a measure of the minimum time required for the magnitude change or phase change of the channel to become uncorrelated from its previous value.

- Slow fading arises when the coherence time of the channel is large relative to the delay requirement of the application. In this regime, the amplitude and phase change imposed by the channel can be considered roughly constant over the period of use. Slow fading can be caused by events such as shadowing, where a large obstruction such as a hill or large building obscures the main signal path between the transmitter and the receiver. The received power change caused by shadowing is often modeled using a log-normal distribution with a standard deviation according to the log-distance path loss model.
- Fast fading occurs when the coherence time of the channel is small relative to the delay requirement of the application. In this case, the amplitude and phase change imposed by the channel varies considerably over the period of use.

In a fast-fading channel, the transmitter may take advantage of the variations in the channel conditions using time diversity to help increase robustness of the communication to a temporary deep fade. Although a deep fade may temporarily erase some of the information transmitted, use of an error-correcting code coupled with successfully transmitted bits during other time instances (interleaving) can allow for the erased bits to be recovered. In a slow-fading channel, it is not possible to use time diversity because the transmitter sees only a single realization of the channel within its delay constraint. A deep fade therefore lasts the entire duration of transmission and cannot be mitigated using coding.

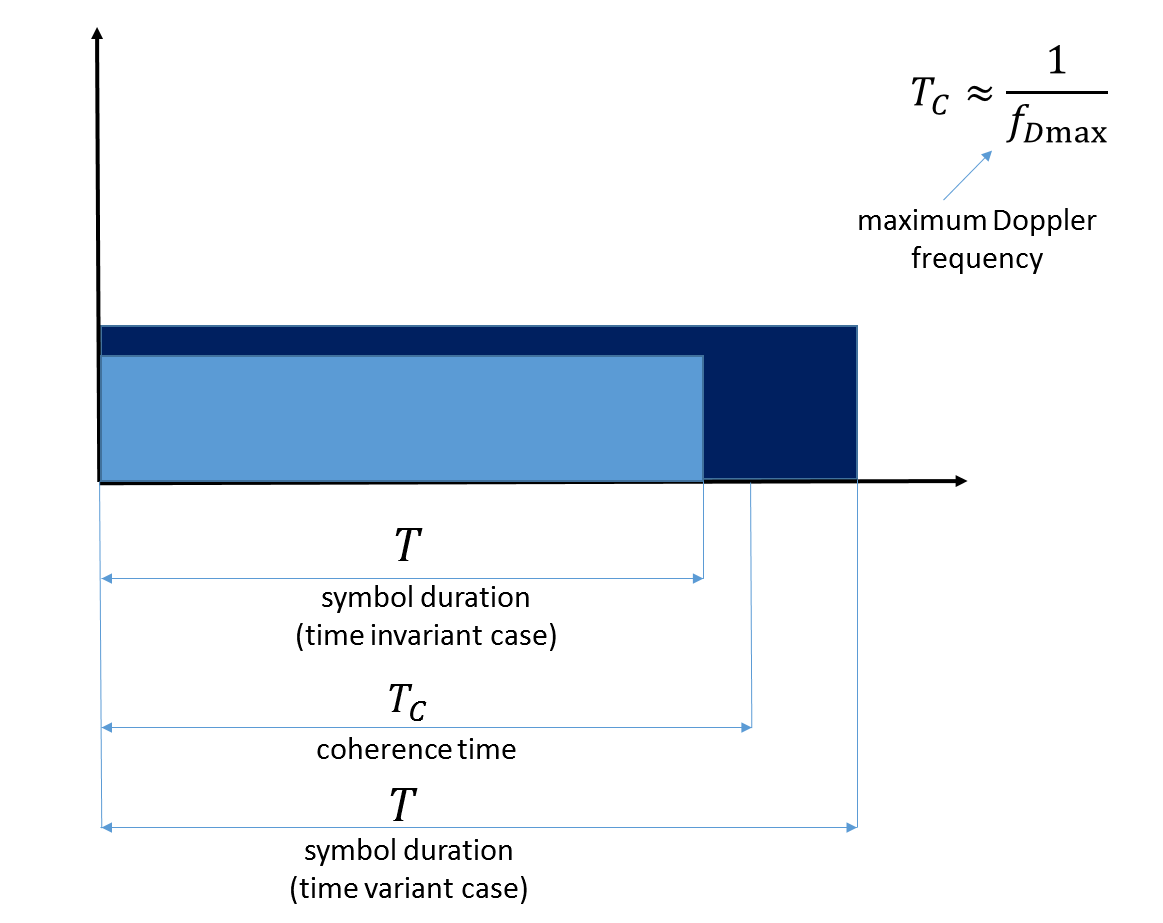

The coherence time of the channel is related to a quantity known as the Doppler spread of the channel. When a user (or reflectors in its environment) is moving, the user's velocity causes a shift in the frequency of the signal transmitted along each signal path. This phenomenon is known as the Doppler shift. Signals traveling along different paths can have different Doppler shifts, corresponding to different rates of change in phase. The difference in Doppler shifts between different signal components contributing to a signal fading channel tap is known as the Doppler spread. Channels with a large Doppler spread have signal components that are each changing independently in phase over time. Since fading depends on whether signal components add constructively or destructively, such channels have a very short coherence time.

In general, coherence time is inversely related to Doppler spread, typically expressed as

$$T_c \approx  \frac{1}{D_s}$$

where $T_c$ is the coherence time, $D_s$ is the Doppler spread. This equation is just an approximation, to be exact, see Coherence time.

=== Block fading ===
Block fading is where the fading process is approximately constant for a number of symbol intervals. A channel can be 'doubly block-fading' when it is block fading in both the time and frequency domains. Many wireless communications channels are dynamic by nature, and are commonly modeled as block fading. In these channels each block of symbols goes through a statistically independent transformation. Typically the slowly-varying channels based on jakes model of Rayleigh spectrum is used for block fading in an OFDM system.

=== Selective fading ===
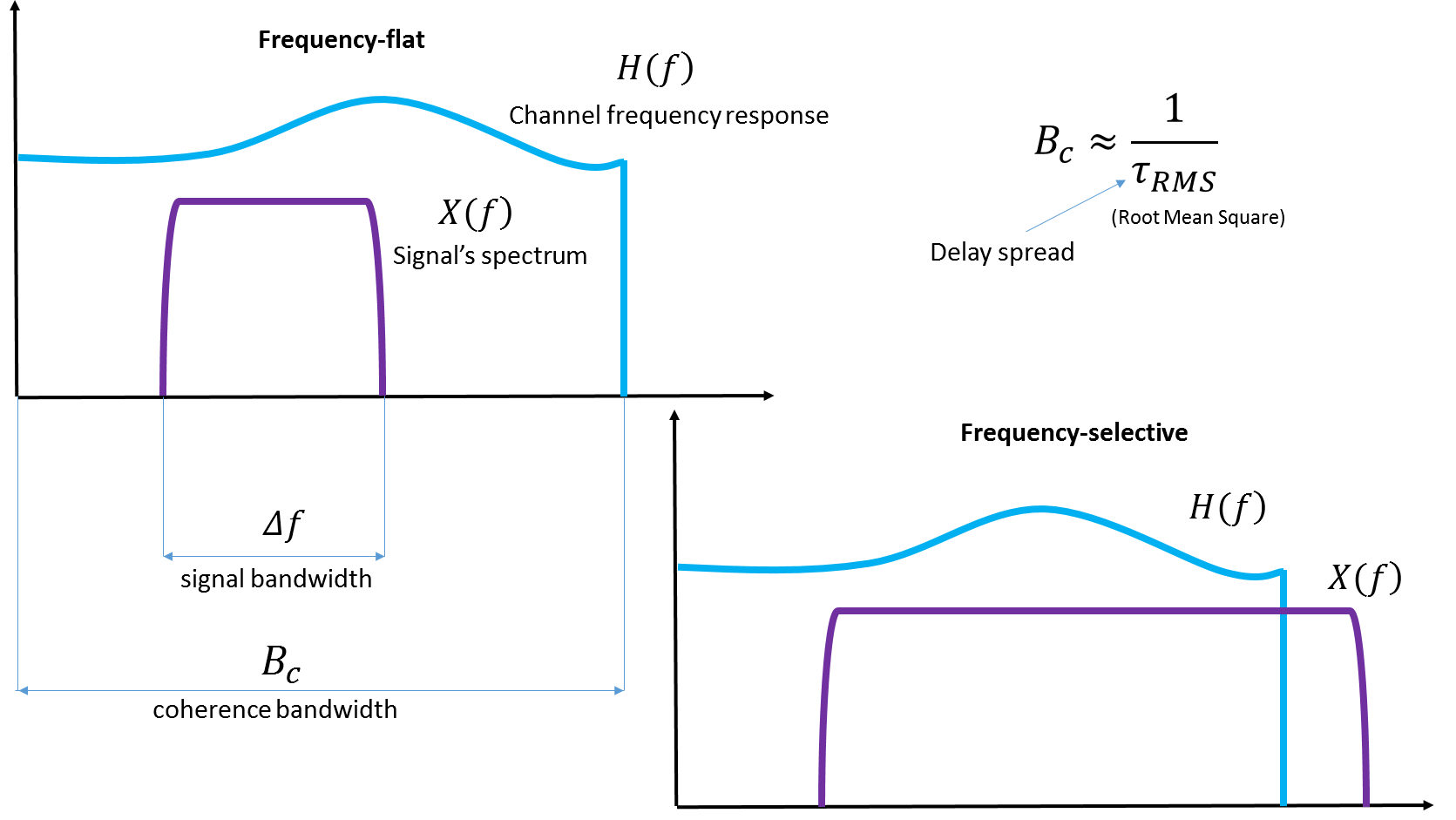

Selective fading or frequency selective fading is a radio propagation anomaly caused by partial cancellation of a radio signal by itself — the signal arrives at the receiver by two different paths, and at least one of the paths is changing (lengthening or shortening). This typically happens in the early evening or early morning as the various layers in the ionosphere move, separate, and combine. The two paths can both be skywave or one be groundwave.

Selective fading manifests as a slow, cyclic disturbance; the cancellation effect, or "null", is deepest at one particular frequency, which changes constantly, sweeping through the received audio.

As the carrier frequency of a signal is varied, the magnitude of the change in amplitude will vary. The coherence bandwidth measures the separation in frequency after which two signals will experience uncorrelated fading.

- In flat fading, the coherence bandwidth of the channel is larger than the bandwidth of the signal. Therefore, all frequency components of the signal will experience the same magnitude of fading.
- In frequency-selective fading, the coherence bandwidth of the channel is smaller than the bandwidth of the signal. Different frequency components of the signal therefore experience uncorrelated fading.

Since different frequency components of the signal are affected independently, it is highly unlikely that all parts of the signal will be simultaneously affected by a deep fade. Certain modulation schemes such as orthogonal frequency-division multiplexing (OFDM) and code-division multiple access (CDMA) are well-suited to employing frequency diversity to provide robustness to fading. OFDM divides the wideband signal into many slowly modulated narrowband subcarriers, each exposed to flat fading rather than frequency selective fading. This can be combated by means of error coding, simple equalization or adaptive bit loading. Inter-symbol interference is avoided by introducing a guard interval between the symbols called a cyclic prefix. CDMA uses the rake receiver to deal with each echo separately.

Frequency-selective fading channels are also dispersive, in that the signal energy associated with each symbol is spread out in time. This causes transmitted symbols that are adjacent in time to interfere with each other. Equalizers are often deployed in such channels to compensate for the effects of the intersymbol interference.

The echoes may also be exposed to Doppler shift, resulting in a time varying channel model.

The effect can be counteracted by applying some diversity scheme, for example OFDM (with subcarrier interleaving and forward error correction), or by using two receivers with separate antennas spaced a quarter-wavelength apart, or a specially designed diversity receiver with two antennas. Such a receiver continuously compares the signals arriving at the two antennas and presents the better signal.

=== Upfade ===
Upfade is a special case of fading, used to describe constructive interference, in situations where a radio signal gains strength. Some multipath conditions cause a signal's amplitude to be increased in this way because signals travelling by different paths arrive at the receiver in phase and become additive to the main signal. Hence, the total signal that reaches the receiver will be stronger than the signal would otherwise have been without the multipath conditions. The effect is also noticeable in wireless LAN systems.

== Models ==
Examples of fading models for the distribution of the attenuation are:

- Dispersive fading models, with several echoes, each exposed to different delay, gain and phase shift, often constant. This results in frequency selective fading and inter-symbol interference. The gains may be Rayleigh or Rician distributed. The echoes may also be exposed to Doppler shift, resulting in a time varying channel model.
- Nakagami fading
- Log-normal shadow fading
- Rayleigh fading
- Rician fading
- Two-wave with diffuse power (TWDP) fading
- Weibull fading

== Mitigation ==
Fading can cause poor performance in a communication system because it can result in a loss of signal power without reducing the power of the noise. This signal loss can be over some or all of the signal bandwidth. Fading can also be a problem as it changes over time: communication systems are often designed to adapt to such impairments, but the fading can change faster than the adaptations can be made. In such cases, the probability of experiencing a fade (and associated bit errors as the signal-to-noise ratio drops) on the channel becomes the limiting factor in the link's performance.

The effects of fading can be combated by using diversity to transmit the signal over multiple channels that experience independent fading and coherently combining them at the receiver. The probability of experiencing a fade in this composite channel is then proportional to the probability that all the component channels simultaneously experience a fade, a much more unlikely event.

Diversity can be achieved in time, frequency, or space. Common techniques used to overcome signal fading include:

- Diversity reception and transmission
- MIMO
- OFDM
- Rake receivers
- Space–time codes
- Forward error correction
- Interleaving

Besides diversity, techniques such as application of cyclic prefix (e.g. in OFDM) and channel estimation and equalization can also be used to tackle fading.

== See also ==
- Attenuation distortion
- Backhoe fade
- Diversity schemes
- Fade margin
- Fading distribution
- Frequency of optimum transmission
- Link budget
- Lowest usable high frequency
- Maximum usable frequency
- Multipath propagation
- OFDM
- Rain fade
- Rayleigh fading
- Thermal fade
- Two-wave with diffuse power (TWDP) fading
- Ultra-wideband
- Upfade

== Literature ==
- T.S. Rappaport, Wireless Communications: Principles and practice, Second Edition, Prentice Hall, 2002.
- David Tse and Pramod Viswanath, Fundamentals of Wireless Communication, Cambridge University Press, 2005.
- M. Awad, K. T. Wong & Z. Li, An Integrative Overview of the Open Literature's Empirical Data on the Indoor Radiowave Channel's Temporal Properties, IEEE Transactions on Antennas & Propagation, vol. 56, no. 5, pp. 1451–1468, May 2008.
- P. Barsocchi, Channel models for terrestrial wireless communications: a survey, CNR-ISTI technical report, April 2006.
