= Weissberger's model =

Weissberger’s modified exponential decay model, or simply, Weissberger’s model, is a radio wave propagation model that estimates the path loss due to the presence of one or more trees in a point-to-point telecommunication link. This model belongs to the category Foliage or Vegetation models.

== Applicable to/under conditions ==
- This model is applicable to the cases of line of sight propagation. Example is microwave transmission.
- This model is only applicable when there is an obstruction made by some foliage in the link. i.e. In between the transmitter and receiver.
- This model is ideal for application in the situation where the LOS path is blocked by dense, dry and leafy trees.

== Coverage ==
Frequency: 230 MHz to 95 GHz

Depth of foliage: up to 400 m

== History ==
Formulated in 1982, this model is a development of the ITU Model for Exponential Decay (MED).

== Mathematical formulation ==
Weissberger’s model is formally expressed as

$$L = \begin{cases} 1.33 \, f^{0.284} \, d^{0.588} \,\mbox{, if } 14 < d \le 400 \\ 0.45 \, f^{0.284} \, d \, \, \, \, \, \, \, \, \, \, \mbox{, if } 0 < d \le 14 \end{cases}$$

where,

L = The loss due to foliage. Unit: decibels (dB)

f = The transmission frequency. Unit: gigahertz (GHz)

d = The depth of foliage along the path. Unit: meters (m)

== Points to note ==
- The equation is scaled for frequency specified in GHz range.
- Depth of foliage must be specified in meters (m).

== Limitations ==
- This model is significant for frequency range 230 MHz to 95 GHz only, as pointed out by Blaunstein.
- This model does not define the operation if the depth of vegetation is more than 400 m.
- This model predicts the loss due to foliage. The path loss must be calculated with inclusion of the free space loss.

== See also ==
- Fresnel zone
- Radio propagation model
