= Longley–Rice model =

Calculation for attenuation of radio signals

The Longley–Rice model (LR) is a radio propagation model: a method for predicting the attenuation of radio signals for a telecommunication link in the frequency range of 40 MHz to 100 GHz.

Longley-Rice is also known as the irregular terrain model (ITM). It was created by scientists Anita Longley and Phil Rice of the Institute for Telecommunication Sciences (then part of the Environmental Science Services Administration) in Boulder, Colorado for the needs of frequency planning in television broadcasting in the United States in the 1960s. The model was extensively used for preparing the tables of channel allocations for VHF/UHF broadcasting there. LR has two parts: a model for predictions over an area and a model for point-to-point link predictions.

== Publications ==
A description of the method was published by the U.S. government under the title "Prediction of Tropospheric Radio Transmission Loss Over Irregular Terrain: A Computer Method - 1968", A. G. Longley and P. L. Rice, NTIA Tech. Rep. ERL 79-ITS 67, U.S. Government Printing Office, Washington, DC, July 1968. This document followed on an earlier publication titled "Transmission loss predictions for tropospheric communication circuits", P.L. Rice, Volume I & II, National Bureau of Standards, Tech. Note 101.

The Longley–Rice model was proposed for frequencies between 20 MHz and 20 GHz for different scenarios and different heights of transmitting and receiving antennas. The model presents a generalization of the received signal power without a detailed characterization of the channel. This model uses statistical resources to compensate for the characterization of the channel, which depends on the variables of each scenario and environment.

The variation of the signal is determined by the prediction model according to the atmospheric changes, topographic profile and free space. These variations are described with the help of statistical estimates which have deviations that contribute to the total attenuation of the signal. The statistical estimates or attenuation variables of this prediction model are: I) Situation variability (Ys); II) Time variability (Yt); II) Location variability (YL). The reference attenuation (W) is determined as a function of the distance, attenuation variables and an urban factor for an area or point-to-point.

Because of this variability, there could be deviations (δ) more or less significant to the attenuation of the transmitted signal. The received signal (W) is obtained signal level attenuated in free space (W0) attenuated by the sum of the attenuation formed by random variables. If transmitter and receiver are at known points, the location variable has a value of zero.

The reference attenuation defined as a function of distance also features 3 ranges for prediction: I) line-of-sight; II) diffraction; III) scatter. For each of these ranges, there are attenuation coefficients defined according to link geometry. These variables also consider the topography that is defined as terrain irregularity parameter ∆h(d) for a reference distance (D0).

== Software ==
Several applications use the Longley-Rice Model. Examples are

- Nautel (requires free registration)
- SPLAT!
- Radio Mobile
- QRadioPredict
- Pathloss 5
- Probe
- RadioLand
- TowerCoverage.com
- rfl

Source code and development libraries

- ITS reference implementation of ITM (C++ source, precompiled DLL, C#/.NET wrapper and NuGet package)
- itmlogic Python package
- Port of the Original ITS sources to Free Pascal/Delphi
- ITM Museum (versions 1, 1.2.1, 1.2.2 and background)
