= Hata model =

Radio propagation model

The Hata model is a radio propagation model for predicting the path loss of cellular transmissions in exterior environments, valid for frequencies from 150 to 1500 MHz. It is an empirical formulation based on the data from the Okumura model, and is thus also commonly referred to as the Okumura–Hata model. The model incorporates the graphical information from Okumura model and develops it further to realize the effects of diffraction, reflection and scattering caused by city structures. Additionally, the Hata Model applies corrections for applications in suburban and rural environments.

== Model description ==
Though based on the Okumura model, the Hata model does not provide coverage to the whole range of frequencies covered by Okumura model. Hata model does not go beyond 1500 MHz while Okumura provides support for up to 1920 MHz. The model is suited for both point-to-point and broadcast communications, and covers mobile station antenna heights of 1–10 m, base station antenna heights of 30–200 m, and link distances from 1–10 km.

=== Urban environments ===
The Hata model for urban environments is the basic formulation since it was based on Okumura's measurements made in the built-up areas of Tokyo. It is formulated as following:

$L_U \; = \; 69.55 \; + \; 26.16 \; \log_{10} f \; - \; 13.82 \; \log_{10} h_B \; - \; C_H \; + \; [44.9 \; - \; 6.55 \; \log_{10} h_B] \; \log_{10} d$

For small or medium-sized city,

$C_H \; = \; 0.8 \; + \; (\; 1.1 \; \log_{10} f \; - \; 0.7 \; ) \; h_M \; - \; 1.56 \; \log_{10} f$

and for large cities,

$$C_H \; = \begin{cases}\;8.29 \; (\; \log_{10} ({1.54 h_M}))^2 \; - \; 1.1 \; \mbox{  , if } 150 \le f \le 200 \\ \; 3.2 \; (\log_{10} ({11.75 h_M}))^2 \; - \; 4.97 \; \mbox{ , if }200 < f \le 1500 \end{cases}$$

where

L_{U} = Path loss in urban areas. Unit: decibel (dB)
h_{B} = Height of base station antenna. Unit: meter (m)
h_{M} = Height of mobile station antenna. Unit: meter (m)
f = Frequency of transmission. Unit: Megahertz (MHz)
C_{H} = Antenna height correction factor
d = Distance between the base and mobile stations. Unit: kilometer (km).

=== Suburban environments ===
The Hata model for suburban environments is applicable to the transmissions just out of the cities and on rural areas where man-made structures are there but not so high and dense as in the cities. To be more precise, this model is suitable where buildings exist, but the mobile station does not have a significant variation of its height. It is formulated as:

$L_{SU}\; = \; L_U \; - \; 2 \big( \log_{10} {\frac{f}{28}}\big)^2 \; - \;5.4$

where

L_{SU} = Path loss in suburban areas. Unit: decibel (dB)
L_{U} = Path loss from the small city version of the model (above). Unit: decibel (dB)
f = Frequency of transmission. Unit: Megahertz (MHz).

=== Open environments ===
The Hata model for rural environments is applicable to the transmissions in open areas where no obstructions block the transmission link. It is formulated as:

$L_{O}\; = \; L_U \; - \; 4.78 \big( \log_{10} {f}\big)^2 \; + \; 18.33 \big( \log_{10} {f}\big)- \;40.94$

where

L_{O} = Path loss in open areas. Unit: decibel (dB)
L_{U} = Average path loss from the small city version of the model (above). Unit: decibel (dB)
f = Frequency of transmission. Unit: megahertz (MHz).

== Derivative models ==
There are more specific models for special uses. For example, the COST Hata model, an urban HataModel, was developed by the European Cooperation in Science and Technology. In turn, the ITU-R P.1546 model is an enhancement to the COST-231 Model.

The Okumura/Hata/Davidson (OHD) model published in Telecommunications Industry Association document TSB-88, extends the frequency range of Hata down to 30 MHz, extends the base antenna height up to 2500 meters, and extends the maximum distance up to 300 km. OHD's extensions are useful in designing Private Land Mobile Radio systems.

PCS is another extension of the Hata model. The Walfisch and Bertoni model is further advanced.
