= Radio propagation =

Behaviour of travelling radio waves

Radio propagation is the behavior of radio waves as they travel, or are propagated, from one point to another in vacuum, or into various parts of the atmosphere. As a form of electromagnetic radiation, like light waves, radio waves are affected by the phenomena of reflection, refraction, diffraction, absorption, polarization, and scattering. Understanding the effects of varying conditions on radio propagation has many practical applications, from choosing frequencies for amateur radio communications, international shortwave broadcasters, to designing reliable mobile telephone systems, to radio navigation, to operation of radar systems.

Several different types of propagation are used in practical radio transmission systems. Line-of-sight propagation means radio waves which travel in a straight line from the transmitting antenna to the receiving antenna. Line of sight transmission is used for medium-distance radio transmission, such as cell phones, cordless phones, walkie-talkies, wireless networks, FM radio, television broadcasting, radar, and satellite communication (such as satellite television). Line-of-sight transmission on the surface of the Earth is limited to the distance to the visual horizon, which depends on the height of transmitting and receiving antennas. Since the Earth's atmosphere is not uniform in properties, calculation of the "line of sight" distance must include the refraction effect in the atmosphere, and attenuation at some frequencies due to precipitation and water vapor. Line-of-sight range may be extended by natural or artificial reflectors.

At lower frequencies in the MF, LF, and VLF bands, diffraction allows radio waves to bend over hills and other obstacles, and travel beyond the horizon, following the contour of the Earth. These are called surface waves or ground wave propagation. AM broadcast and amateur radio stations use ground waves to cover their listening areas. As the frequency gets lower, the attenuation with distance decreases, so very low frequency (VLF) to extremely low frequency (ELF) ground waves can be used to communicate worldwide. VLF to ELF waves can penetrate significant distances through water and earth, and these frequencies are used for mine communication and military communication with submerged submarines.

At medium wave and shortwave frequencies (MF and HF bands), radio waves can refract from the ionosphere, a layer of charged particles (ions) high in the atmosphere. This means that medium and short radio waves transmitted at an angle into the sky can be refracted back to Earth at great distances beyond the horizon – even transcontinental distances. This is called skywave propagation. It is used by amateur radio operators to communicate with operators in distant countries, and by shortwave broadcast stations to transmit internationally. (Note: Skywave communication is variable: It depends on conditions in the ionosphere. Long distance shortwave transmission is most reliable at night and during the winter. Since the advent of communication satellites in the 1960s, many long range communication needs that previously used skywaves now use satellites and submerged cables, to avoid dependence on the erratic performance of skywave communications.)

In addition, there are several less common radio propagation mechanisms, such as tropospheric scattering (troposcatter), tropospheric ducting (ducting) at VHF frequencies and near vertical incidence skywave (NVIS) which are used when HF communications are desired within a few hundred miles.

== Frequency dependence ==
At different frequencies, radio waves travel through the atmosphere by different mechanisms or modes:

Radio frequencies and their primary mode of propagation
Band		Frequency	Wavelength	Propagation via
ELF	Extremely Low Frequency	3–30 Hz	100,000–10,000 km	Guided between the Earth and the D layer of the ionosphere.
SLF	Super Low Frequency	30–300 Hz	10,000–1,000 km	Guided between the Earth and the ionosphere.
ULF	Ultra Low Frequency	0.3–3 kHz (300–3,000 Hz)	1,000–100 km	Guided between the Earth and the ionosphere.
VLF	Very Low Frequency	3–30 kHz (3,000–30,000 Hz)	100–10 km	Guided between the Earth and the ionosphere. Ground waves.
LF	Low Frequency	30–300 kHz (30,000–300,000 Hz)	10–1 km	Guided between the Earth and the ionosphere. Ground waves.
MF	Medium Frequency	300–3,000 kHz (300,000–3,000,000 Hz)	1000–100 m	Ground waves. E, F layer ionospheric refraction at night, when D layer absorption weakens.
HF	High Frequency (Short Wave)	3–30 MHz (3,000,000–30,000,000 Hz)	100–10 m	E layer ionospheric refraction. F1, F2 layer ionospheric refraction.
VHF	Very High Frequency	30–300 MHz (30,000,000– 300,000,000 Hz)	10–1 m	Line-of-sight propagation. Infrequent E ionospheric (E_{s}) refraction. Uncommonly F2 layer ionospheric refraction during high sunspot activity up to 50 MHz and rarely to 80 MHz. Sometimes tropospheric ducting or meteor scatter
UHF	Ultra High Frequency	300–3,000 MHz (300,000,000– 3,000,000,000 Hz)	100–10 cm	Line-of-sight propagation. Sometimes tropospheric ducting.
SHF	Super High Frequency	3–30 GHz (3,000,000,000– 30,000,000,000 Hz)	10–1 cm	Line-of-sight propagation. Sometimes rain scatter.
EHF	Extremely High Frequency	30–300 GHz (30,000,000,000– 300,000,000,000 Hz)	10–1 mm	Line-of-sight propagation, limited by atmospheric absorption to a few kilometers (miles)
THF	Tremendously High frequency	0.3–3 THz (300,000,000,000– 3,000,000,000,000 Hz)	1–0.1 mm	Line-of-sight propagation, limited by atmospheric absorption to a few meters.
FIR	Far infrared light (overlaps radio)	0.3–20 THz (300,000,000,000– 20,000,000,000,000 Hz)	1,000–150 μm	Line-of-sight propagation, mostly limited by atmospheric absorption to a few meters.

== Free space propagation ==
In free space, all electromagnetic waves (radio, light, X-rays, etc.) obey the inverse-square law which states that the power density $\rho\,$ of an electromagnetic wave is proportional to the inverse of the square of the distance $r\,$ from a point source or:

$$\rho \propto \frac{1}{r^2}~.$$

At typical communication distances from a transmitter, the transmitting antenna usually can be approximated by a point source. Doubling the distance of a receiver from a transmitter means that the power density of the radiated wave at that new location is reduced to one-quarter of its previous value.

The power density per surface unit is proportional to the product of the electric and magnetic field strengths. Thus, doubling the propagation path distance from the transmitter reduces each of these received field strengths over a free-space path by one-half.

Radio waves in vacuum travel at the speed of light. The Earth's atmosphere is thin enough that radio waves in the atmosphere travel very close to the speed of light, but variations in density and temperature can cause some slight refraction (bending) of waves over distances.

== Direct modes (line-of-sight) ==
Line-of-sight refers to radio waves which travel directly in a line from the transmitting antenna to the receiving antenna, often also called direct-wave. It does not necessarily require a cleared sight path; at lower frequencies radio waves can pass through buildings, foliage and other obstructions. This is the most common propagation mode at VHF and above, and the only possible mode at microwave frequencies and above. On the surface of the Earth, line of sight propagation is limited by the visual horizon to about 40 miles (64 km). This is the method used by cell phones, (Note: Cellular networks function even without a single clear line-of-sight by relaying signals along multiple line-of-sight paths through cell towers.) cordless phones, walkie-talkies, wireless networks, point-to-point microwave radio relay links, FM and television broadcasting and radar. Satellite communication uses longer line-of-sight paths; for example home satellite dishes receive signals from communication satellites 22,000 miles (35,000 km) above the Earth, and ground stations can communicate with spacecraft billions of miles from Earth.

Ground plane reflection effects are an important factor in VHF line-of-sight propagation. The interference between the direct beam line-of-sight and the ground reflected beam often leads to an effective inverse-fourth-power (1/distance^{4}) law for ground-plane limited radiation.

== Surface modes (groundwave) ==
Ground wave propagation

Lower frequency (between 30 and 3,000 kHz) vertically polarized radio waves can travel as surface waves following the contour of the Earth; this is called ground wave propagation.

In this mode the radio wave propagates by interacting with the conductive surface of the Earth. The wave "clings" to the surface and thus follows the curvature of the Earth, so ground waves can travel over mountains and beyond the horizon. Ground waves propagate in vertical polarization so vertical antennas (monopoles) are required. Since the ground is not a perfect electrical conductor, ground waves are attenuated as they follow the Earth's surface. Attenuation is proportional to frequency, so ground waves are the main mode of propagation at lower frequencies, in the MF, LF and VLF bands. Ground waves are used by radio broadcasting stations in the MF and LF bands, and for time signals and radio navigation systems.

At even lower frequencies, in the VLF to ELF bands, an Earth-ionosphere waveguide mechanism allows even longer range transmission. These frequencies are used for secure military communications. They can also penetrate to a significant depth into seawater, and so are used for one-way military communication to submerged submarines.

Early long-distance radio communication (wireless telegraphy) before the mid-1920s used low frequencies in the longwave bands and relied exclusively on ground-wave propagation. Frequencies above 3 MHz were regarded as useless and were given to hobbyists (radio amateurs). The discovery around 1920 of the ionospheric reflection or skywave mechanism made the medium wave and short wave frequencies useful for long-distance communication and they were allocated to commercial and military users.

== Non-line-of-sight modes ==
Non-line-of-sight (NLOS) radio propagation is the propagation of radio waves over a path where the direct line-of-sight between the transmitting and receiving antennas is obstructed. It is common in urban areas, indoor environments and mountainous terrain, where buildings, walls, vegetation, hills, mountains or the curvature of the Earth block the direct path.

In NLOS conditions, radio communication depends on mechanisms such as reflection, diffraction, scattering, groundwave propagation, tropospheric scatter, ionospheric propagation, multipath propagation or radio repeaters. NLOS links usually have lower and more variable received power than unobstructed line-of-sight links and can cause fading, delay spread and errors in radio-based positioning systems.

== Measuring HF propagation ==
HF propagation conditions can be simulated using radio propagation models, such as the Voice of America Coverage Analysis Program, and realtime measurements can be done using chirp transmitters. For radio amateurs the WSPR mode provides maps with real time propagation conditions between a network of transmitters and receivers. Even without special beacons the realtime propagation conditions can be measured: A worldwide network of receivers decodes morse code signals on amateur radio frequencies in realtime and provides sophisticated search functions and propagation maps for every station received.

== Practical effects ==
The average person can notice the effects of changes in radio propagation in several ways.

In AM broadcasting, the dramatic ionospheric changes that occur overnight in the mediumwave band drive a unique broadcast license scheme in the United States, with entirely different transmitter power output levels and directional antenna patterns to cope with skywave propagation at night. Very few stations are allowed to run without modifications during dark hours, typically only those on clear channels in North America. Many stations have no authorization to run at all outside of daylight hours.

For FM broadcasting (and the few remaining low-band TV stations), weather is the primary cause for changes in VHF propagation, along with some diurnal changes when the sky is mostly without cloud cover. These changes are most obvious during temperature inversions, such as in the late-night and early-morning hours when it is clear, allowing the ground and the air near it to cool more rapidly. This not only causes dew, frost, or fog, but also causes a slight "drag" on the bottom of the radio waves, bending the signals down such that they can follow the Earth's curvature over the normal radio horizon. The result is typically several stations being heard from another media market – usually a neighboring one, but sometimes ones from a few hundred kilometers (miles) away. Ice storms are also the result of inversions, but these normally cause more scattered omnidirection propagation, resulting mainly in interference, often among weather radio stations. In late spring and early summer, a combination of other atmospheric factors can occasionally cause skips that duct high-power signals to places well over 1000 km (600 miles) away.

Non-broadcast signals are also affected. Mobile phone signals are in the UHF band, ranging from 700 to over 2600 MHz, a range which makes them even more prone to weather-induced propagation changes. In urban (and to some extent suburban) areas with a high population density, this is partly offset by the use of smaller cells, which use lower effective radiated power and beam tilt to reduce interference, and therefore increase frequency reuse and user capacity. However, since this would not be very cost-effective in more rural areas, these cells are larger and so more likely to cause interference over longer distances when propagation conditions allow.

While this is generally transparent to the user thanks to the way that cellular networks handle cell-to-cell handoffs, when cross-border signals are involved, unexpected charges for international roaming may occur despite not having left the country at all. This often occurs between southern San Diego and northern Tijuana at the western end of the U.S./Mexico border, and between eastern Detroit and western Windsor along the U.S./Canada border. Since signals can travel unobstructed over a body of water far larger than the Detroit River, and cool water temperatures also cause inversions in surface air, this "fringe roaming" sometimes occurs across the Great Lakes, and between islands in the Caribbean. Signals can skip from the Dominican Republic to a mountainside in Puerto Rico and vice versa, or between the U.S. and British Virgin Islands, among others. While unintended cross-border roaming is often automatically removed by mobile phone company billing systems, inter-island roaming is typically not.

== Empirical models ==
A radio propagation model, also known as the radio wave propagation model or the radio frequency propagation model, is an empirical mathematical formulation for the characterization of radio wave propagation as a function of frequency, distance and other conditions. A single model is usually developed to predict the behavior of propagation for all similar links under similar constraints. Created with the goal of formalizing the way radio waves are propagated from one place to another, such models typically predict the path loss along a link or the effective coverage area of a transmitter.

The inventor of radio communication, Guglielmo Marconi, before 1900 formulated the first crude empirical rule of radio propagation: the maximum transmission distance varied as the square of the height of the antenna.

As the path loss encountered along any radio link serves as the dominant factor for characterization of propagation for the link, radio propagation models typically focus on realization of the path loss with the auxiliary task of predicting the area of coverage for a transmitter or modeling the distribution of signals over different regions.

Because each individual telecommunication link has to encounter different terrain, path, obstructions, atmospheric conditions and other phenomena, it is intractable to formulate the exact loss for all telecommunication systems in a single mathematical equation. As a result, different models exist for different types of radio links under different conditions. The models rely on computing the median path loss for a link under a certain probability that the considered conditions will occur.

Radio propagation models are empirical in nature, which means, they are developed based on large collections of data collected for the specific scenario. For any model, the collection of data has to be sufficiently large to provide enough likeliness (or enough scope) to all kind of situations that can happen in that specific scenario. Like all empirical models, radio propagation models do not point out the exact behavior of a link, rather, they predict the most likely behavior the link may exhibit under the specified conditions.

Different models have been developed to meet the needs of realizing the propagation behavior in different conditions. Types of models for radio propagation include:

Models for free space attenuation

- Free-space path loss
- Dipole field strength in free space
- Friis transmission equation

Models for outdoor attenuation

- Terrain models
  - ITU terrain model
  - Egli model
  - Longley–Rice irregular terrain model (ITM)
  - Two-ray ground-reflection model
- City models
  - Okumura model
  - Hata model
  - COST Hata model

Models for indoor attenuation

- ITU model for indoor attenuation
- Log-distance path loss model

== See also ==
- Anomalous propagation
- Channel model
- Computation of radiowave attenuation in the atmosphere
- Critical frequency
- Diversity scheme
- Earth bulge
- Earth-ionosphere waveguide
- Effective Earth radius
- Electromagnetic radiation
- F2 propagation
- Fading
- Free space
- Fresnel zone
- Inversion (meteorology)
- Kennelly–Heaviside layer
- Link budget
- Mobility model
- Nakagami fading
- Near and far field
- Propagation graph
- Radio atmospherics
- Radio frequency
- Radio horizon
- Radio resource management
- Ray tracing (physics)
- Rayleigh fading
- Schumann resonance
- Skip (radio)
- Skip zone
- Skywave
- Traffic generation model
- Tropospheric propagation
- TV and FM DX
- Upfade
- Vertical and horizontal (radio propagation)
- VOACAP – Free professional HF propagation prediction software
