= Path loss =

Signal attenuation in telecommunications

Path loss, or path attenuation, is the reduction in power density (attenuation) of an electromagnetic wave as it propagates through space. Path loss is a major component in the analysis and design of the link budget of a telecommunication system.

This term is commonly used in wireless communications and signal propagation. Path loss may be due to many effects, such as free-space loss, refraction, diffraction, reflection, aperture-medium coupling loss, and absorption. Path loss is also influenced by terrain contours, environment (urban or rural, vegetation and foliage), propagation medium (dry or moist air), the distance between the transmitter and the receiver, and the height and location of antennas.

== Overview ==
In wireless communications, path loss is the reduction in signal strength as the signal travels from a transmitter to a receiver, and is an application for verifying the loss. There are several factors that affect this:

- Free-space path loss: This is the fundamental loss that occurs due to the spreading of the radio wave as it propagates through space. It follows an inverse square law, meaning the signal strength decreases proportionally to the square of the distance between the transmitter and receiver.
- Diffraction: When a radio wave encounters an obstacle, it can be diffracted, or bent around the edge of the obstacle. This can cause additional signal loss, especially in urban environments with many buildings.
- Absorption: Certain atmospheric gases and obstacles like buildings and foliage can absorb radio waves, reducing their strength.
- Reflection and scattering: Radio waves can be reflected off surfaces like buildings and the ground, and scattered by objects like trees and lampposts. This can lead to multipath propagation, where the receiver receives multiple copies of the signal that may interfere with each other.

In understanding path loss and minimizing it, there are four key factors to consider in designing a wireless communication system:

1) Determining the required transmitter power: The transmitter must have enough power to overcome the path loss in order for the signal to reach the receiver with sufficient strength.

2) Determine the appropriate antenna design and gain: Antennas with higher gain can focus the waves in a specific direction, reducing the path loss.

3) Optimize modulation scheme: The choice of modulation scheme can affect the robustness of the signal to path loss.

4) Set the receiver sensitivity appropriately: The receiver must be sensitive enough to detect weak signals.

== Causes ==
Path loss normally includes propagation losses caused by the natural expansion of the radio wave front in free space (which usually takes the shape of an ever-increasing sphere), absorption losses (sometimes called penetration losses), when the signal passes through media not transparent to electromagnetic waves, diffraction losses when part of the radiowave front is obstructed by an opaque obstacle, and losses caused by other phenomena.

The signal radiated by a transmitter may also travel along many and different paths to a receiver simultaneously; this effect is called multipath. Multipath waves combine at the receiver antenna, resulting in a received signal that may vary widely, depending on the distribution of the intensity and relative propagation time of the waves and bandwidth of the transmitted signal. The total power of interfering waves in a Rayleigh fading scenario varies quickly as a function of space (which is known as small scale fading). Small-scale fading refers to the rapid changes in radio signal amplitude in a short period of time or distance of travel.

== Loss exponent ==
In the study of wireless communications, path loss can be represented by the path loss exponent, whose value is normally in the range of 2 to 4 (where 2 is for propagation in free space, 4 is for relatively lossy environments and for the case of full specular reflection from the earth surface—the so-called flat earth model). In some environments, such as buildings, stadiums and other indoor environments, the path loss exponent can reach values in the range of 4 to 6. On the other hand, a tunnel may act as a waveguide, resulting in a path loss exponent less than 2.

Path loss is usually expressed in dB. In its simplest form, the path loss can be calculated using the formula

$$L = 10 n \log_{10}(d)+C$$

where $L$ is the path loss in decibels, $n$ is the path loss exponent, $d$ is the distance between the transmitter and the receiver, usually measured in meters, and $C$ is a constant which accounts for system losses.

== Radio engineer formula ==
Radio and antenna engineers use the following simplified formula (derived from the Friis Transmission Formula) for the signal path loss between the feed points of two isotropic antennas in free space:

Path loss in dB:

$$L = 20 \log_{10}\left(\frac{4\pi d} \lambda \right)$$

where $L$ is the path loss in decibels, $\lambda$ is the wavelength and $d$ is the transmitter-receiver distance in the same units as the wavelength. Note the power density in space has no dependency on $\lambda$; The variable $\lambda$ exists in the formula to account for the effective capture area of the isotropic receiving antenna.

== Prediction ==
Calculation of the path loss is usually called prediction. Exact prediction is possible only for simpler cases, such as the above-mentioned free space propagation or the flat-earth model. For practical cases the path loss is calculated using a variety of approximations.

Statistical methods (also called stochastic or empirical) are based on measured and averaged losses along typical classes of radio links. Among the most commonly used such methods are Okumura–Hata, the COST Hata model, W.C.Y.Lee, etc. These are also known as radio wave propagation models and are typically used in the design of cellular networks and public land mobile networks (PLMN). For wireless communications in the very high frequency (VHF) and ultra high frequency (UHF) frequency band (the bands used by walkie-talkies, police, taxis and cellular phones), one of the most commonly used methods is that of Okumura–Hata as refined by the COST 231 project. Other well-known models are those of Walfisch–Ikegami, W. C. Y. Lee, and Erceg. For FM radio and TV broadcasting the path loss is most commonly predicted using the ITU model as described in P.1546 (successor to P.370) recommendation.

Deterministic methods based on the physical laws of wave propagation are also used; ray tracing is one such method. These methods are expected to produce more accurate and reliable predictions of the path loss than the empirical methods; however, they are significantly more expensive in computational effort and depend on the detailed and accurate description of all objects in the propagation space, such as buildings, roofs, windows, doors, and walls. For these reasons they are used predominantly for short propagation paths. Among the most commonly used methods in the design of radio equipment such as antennas and feeds is the finite-difference time-domain method.

The path loss in other frequency bands (medium wave (MW), shortwave (SW or HF), microwave (SHF)) is predicted with similar methods, though the concrete algorithms and formulas may be very different from those for VHF/UHF. Reliable prediction of the path loss in the SW/HF band is particularly difficult, and its accuracy is comparable to weather predictions.

Easy approximations for calculating the path loss over distances significantly shorter than the distance to the radio horizon:

- In free space the path loss increases with 20 dB per decade (one decade is when the distance between the transmitter and the receiver increases ten times) or 6 dB per octave (one octave is when the distance between the transmitter and the receiver doubles). This can be used as a very rough first-order approximation for (microwave) communication links;
- For signals in the UHF/VHF band propagating over the surface of the Earth the path loss increases with roughly 35–40 dB per decade (10–12 dB per octave). This can be used in cellular networks as a first guess.

== Examples ==
In cellular networks, such as UMTS and GSM, which operate in the UHF band, the value of the path loss in built-up areas can reach 110–140 dB for the first kilometer of the link between the base transceiver station (BTS) and the mobile. The path loss for the first ten kilometers may be 150–190 dB (Note: These values are very approximate and are given here only as an illustration of the range in which the numbers used to express the path loss values can eventually be, these are not definitive or binding figures—the path loss may be very different for the same distance along two different paths and it can be different even along the same path if measured at different times.)

In the radio wave environment for mobile services the mobile antenna is close to the ground. Line-of-sight propagation (LOS) models are highly modified. The signal path from the BTS antenna normally elevated above the roof tops is refracted down into the local physical environment (hills, trees, houses) and the LOS signal seldom reaches the antenna. The environment will produce several deflections of the direct signal onto the antenna, where typically 2–5 deflected signal components will be vectorially added.

These refraction and deflection processes cause loss of signal strength, which changes when the mobile antenna moves (Rayleigh fading), causing instantaneous variations of up to 20 dB. The network is therefore designed to provide an excess of signal strength compared to LOS of 8–25 dB depending on the nature of the physical environment, and another 10 dB to overcome the fading due to movement.

== See also ==
- Air mass (astronomy)
- Radio propagation model
- Log-distance path loss model
- Two-ray ground-reflection model
- Computation of radiowave attenuation in the atmosphere
