= Ionospheric storm =

Storms containing densities of energized electrons

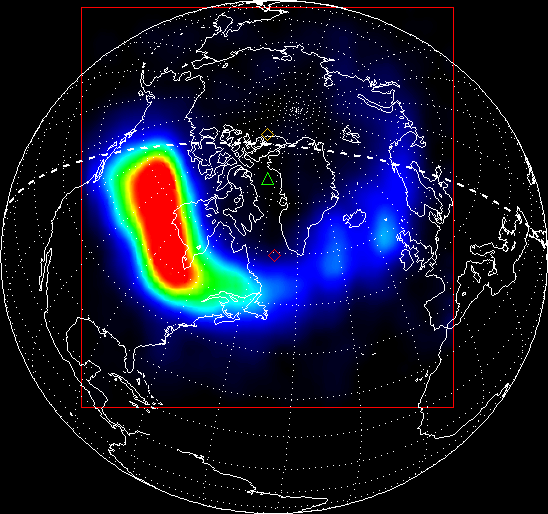
X-Ray image of aurora borealis taken during an ionospheric storm by the Global Geospace Science Polar satellite

Ionospheric storms are storms which contain varying densities of energised electrons in the ionosphere as produced from the Sun. Ionospheric storms are caused by geomagnetic storms. They are categorised into positive and negative storms, where positive storms have a high density of electrons and negative storms contain a lower density. The total electron content (TEC) is used to measure these densities, and is a key variable used in data to record and compare the intensities of ionospheric storms.

Ionospheric storm occurrences are strongly linked with sudden increases of solar wind speed, where solar wind brings energised electrons into the upper atmosphere of Earth and contributes to increased TEC. Larger storms form global visibility of auroras. Auroras are most commonly seen in the Arctic Circle; however, large ionospheric storms allow for them to be visible at somewhat lower latitudes. The most intense ionospheric storm occurred in 1859, commonly named the "solar storm of 1859" or the "Carrington Event." The Carrington Event was named after Richard Carrington, an English astronomer who observed the irregular sun activity that occurred during the Carrington Event. The intensity of the storm brought the visibility of the aurora to lower latitudes, and it was reportedly seen in places such as Florida and the Caribbean. Ionospheric storms can happen at any time and location.

F-region and D-region ionospheric storms are also considered main categories of ionospheric storms. The F-region storms occur due to sudden increases of energised electrons instilled into Earth's ionosphere. The F-region is the highest region of the ionosphere. Consisting of the F1 and F2 layers, its distance above the Earth's surface is approximately 200–500 km. The duration of these storms are around a day and reoccur every approximately 27.3 days. Most ionospheric abnormalities occur in the F2 and E layers of the ionosphere. D-region storms occur immediately after F-region storms, and are referred to as the "Post-Storm Effect," the duration of it spanning for a week after the F-region storm's occurrence.

== Historical occurrences ==
The largest ionospheric storm occurred during the Carrington event on August 28, 1859 and caused extensive damages to various parts including the sparking of fires in railway signals and telegraph wires. The substantial density of energised electrons produced by the storm caused these electrical overloads and shortages.

Occurrences of storms in the last 35 years have been consolidated and measured in maximum Ap which records the average daily geomagnetic activity during ionospheric storms. There are higher levels of geomagnetic activity with high maximum Ap counts. Ap counts in terms of geomagnetic activity from 0-7 are considered "quiet," 8-15 "unsettled," 16-29 "active," 30-49 "minor storm," 50-99 "major storm," and above 100 classified as a "severe storm." Minor storms in the last 35 years ranging from 30-49 Ap occurred on 13 September 1999 (46), 11 October 2008 (34), 11 March 2011 (37), 9 October 2012 (46) and on 19 February 2014 (43). Major storms ranging from 50-99 Ap occurred on 6 April 2000 (82), 7 April 2000 (74), 11 April 2001 (85), 18 April 2002 (63), 20 April 2002 (70), 22 January 2004 (64), 18 January 2005 (84), 5 April 2010 (55), 9 March 2012 (87), 15 July 2012 (78) and on 1 June 2013 (58). Severe storms equalling or exceeding 100 Ap occurred on 8 February 1986 (202), 9 February 1986 (100), 13 March 1989 (246), 14 March 1989 (158), 17 November 1989 (109), 10 April 1990 (124), 7 April 1995 (100), 31 March 2001 (192), 6 November 2001 (142), 18 August 2003 (108), 29 October 2003 (204), 30 October 2003 (191), 20 November 2003 (150), 27 July 2004 (186), 8 November 2004 (140) and on 10 November 2004 (161).

In recent accounts, the St Patrick's Day storms in March 2013 and 2015 caused a strong negative phase in the F2 ionospheric region. The March 2013 and 2015 storms were also long-lasting, spanning for over 6 hours. The June 2015 Southern Hemisphere winter storm had a shorter duration, lasting between 4 and 6 hours, and producing a positive effect in the ionosphere. It is difficult to determine the exact location and time for the occurrences of ionospheric storms, their effects being dependent on season, their varying starting points, compositional changes in the ionosphere and the travelling ionospheric disturbances (TIDs) in relation to gravity waves having varying impacts on different locations.

== Phases of ionospheric storms ==
In the commencement of an ionospheric storm, due to geomagnetic disturbances in the ionosphere, the storm will become positive for a brief duration. Then, it will become a negative phase storm, and revert to a recovery phase where electron density neutralises.

=== Positive phase ===
The positive phase of an ionospheric storm will last for around the first 24 hours. In this phase, electron density in the ionosphere, particularly in higher altitude layers such as F1 and F2 will increase. Ionisation in the positive phase will be less apparent due to the increase of electron density. Positive phase ionospheric storms have a longer duration and are more prevalent in winter. During the positive phase of large ionospheric storms, the altitude of ionospheric F-region increases, resulting in the massive tongue-shaped plasma anomaly spreading anti-sunward over the geomagnetic pole, which can be observed by ground radars, as well as by satellites and the GPS system. Even for the largest geomagnetic storms, such as the 20 November 2003 superstorm, modern general circulation models are able to simulate positive ionospheric anomalies.

=== Negative phase ===
The negative phase of an ionospheric storm will occur directly after the storm's positive phase and last one to two days after the positive phase decreases in electron density to "below its quiet time reference level." Negative phases decrease the electron density of the storm. They also span for longer durations and appear more often during summer.

=== Recovery phase ===
The recovery phase of the ionospheric storm occurs after the negative phase ends and neutralises the electron density. A time scale of 12 hours to 1 day can be used in accordance with the Thermosphere Ionosphere General Circulation Model (TIGCM) as a means of calculating the precise time of electron density restabilising post-storm.

== Effects on ionospheric layers ==
The effects of ionospheric storms on different layers in the ionosphere including in the F-region, E-region and D-region vary depending on the magnitude of the storm. F-Region is the most affected layer due to it ranging the highest altitude compared to the E-region and D-region. The D-region is the region with the lowest altitude and will receive the least geomagnetic disturbance.

=== F-region ===
The F-region is the highest layer of the ionosphere and inner atmosphere, around 200 km above Earth's surface and spanning around 300 km in total layer altitude. The F2-region of the F-region (highest altitude inner atmospheric layer) will be affected through the decrease of critical frequency and maximum usable frequency, which is necessary for high-frequency radio communication. The F-region is affected by the friction of solar wind on the ionospheric boundaries which causes magnetospheric motion that may infiltrate into the ionosphere or exit it, creating disturbances that increase and decrease TEC and electron density. During ionospheric storms, it is more common for "anomalous" increases and decreases of TEC and electron density to occur in the F2-layer. Ionisation density is also affected in the F-region, decreasing as the height increases, and as ionisation density increases, atoms lose electrons and therefore lower altitudes lose electron density. The lower layers of the F-region such as the F1-layer have higher amounts of ionisation and less electron density. Dramatic increases in the F-region altitude, explaining the increases in TEC and electron density, have been also reproduced by numerical modelling.

=== E-region ===
The E-region is the middle layer of the ionosphere, approximately 100 km above the Earth's surface, spanning around 100 km up. Effects on the E-region are mainly associated with the high latitudes of the layer, where more severe geomagnetic disturbances occur. Ionisation in this layer is predominantly derived from the particle precipitation in auroras. Due to its lower latitude, there is greater ionisation density compared to that of the F-region, and less electron density. Increased conductivity of currents is caused by the convection electric fields of the magnetosphere that run down the lines of the magnetic field in the E-region. The increased conductivity is also from the effects of the ionospheric storm. There is also a maximisation in the E-region of the transfer of energy from plasma to neutral particles which promotes "frictional heating" and is used as a heat source for the thermosphere.

=== D-region ===
The D-region is the lowest layer of the ionosphere, approximately 60 km above the Earth's surface and its layer's altitude spanning around 30–40 km. The top of the D-region is around 90–100 km above the Earth's surface. When ionospheric storms occur, there is enhanced ionisation of electrons that happens in the D-region and causes a decline in day-night asymmetry (DLPT depth). DLPT depth is calculated by subtracting average day rate by average night rate and dividing it by the average of the rates. The DLPT depth decreases as Ap increases in the D-layer.

== Impacts ==
=== Radio communications ===
There can be strong disturbances to telecommunications in the event of an ionospheric storm, where in middle and high altitudes, radio communications are considered "ineffective." This is due to radio waves being found in the ionosphere where the sudden increase of solar wind and energised electrons will interfere. The impacts of disturbances related to radio communications can include temporary blackouts of signal to radio wave-based technology such as televisions, radios, and cordless phones. Global impacts vary, including the detriment of digital broadcasting and the displaying of information through radio-communication technologies which may temporarily eliminate the use of certain technologies.

=== Aircraft and electrical systems ===
Aircraft passengers and crew receive a higher dose of radiation during an ionospheric storm, relative to people at sea level. Flight altitudes are usually 10 km or more, so when an ionospheric storm occurs during the flight, people on the plane will potentially gain an approximate 0.1% chance of developing a lethal cancer during their lifetime. The plane when flying at a 10 km or above altitude will have around 300 times more exposure to ionised radiation than on sea level. The energised particles produced by the ionospheric storm can also potentially cause damage and disrupt microelectronic circuitry due to single-event error (SEE), when the energised particles interconnect with the semiconductor device and causes system failure. The short-circuiting of aircraft electrical equipment can be a distraction to the aircrew, which can be a safety hazard.

=== Satellites ===
Solar cells on satellites may be damaged or destroyed in ionospheric storms, which can hinder the transmission of signals.

=== Climate ===
Earthward solar winds and excessive radiation produced from it has limited effect on the climate. The radiation emitted by solar wind only reaches the highest layers of the Earth's atmosphere, including the ionosphere. There are however reports of a possible impact on lower layers of the atmosphere. It is recorded that the increase of solar wind during March 2012 in the United States coincided with the heat waves that occurred at the time. A statistical connection between the occurrence of heavy floods and ionospheric storms caused by high-speed solar wind streams (HSSs) has been also reported. The enhanced energy deposition into the auroral ionosphere during HSSs is suggested to generate downward-propagating atmospheric gravity waves. The excited gravity waves reach lower atmosphere, triggering an instability in the troposphere and leading to excessive rainfall.

=== GPS and GNSS systems ===
Due to the disturbances of signals in the ionosphere caused by ionospheric storms, GPS systems are drastically affected. In the late 20th and 21st centuries, GPS signals were incorporated within various phones, so the commonality of its use has greatly increased since its release. It is a significant piece of technology that is almost entirely affected as it serves the purpose of displaying directions, which can prevent people from being able to tell directions. Directional equipment like Global Navigation Satellite Services (GNSS) is also used in aircraft. This system can be compromised by radiation damage on satellites and solar cells all of which are needed for this navigation system to work. When an aircraft loses access to GNSS in the event of an ionospheric storm, backup aircraft procedures are available.

== Storm detection technology ==
During the Carrington Event in 1859 where there were only a limited number of available measuring technologies, the full extent of the impacts could not be precisely recorded apart from recounts in newspaper articles written in 1859. In the late 20th and early 21st century, forecasting technology has been improved. This technology allows meteorologists to detect the highest frequency that can be vertically returned 24 hours in advance with accuracy of 8-13% periods with limited disturbance. PropMan, created by K. Davies in the early 1970s is a program that contains the ionospheric prediction code (IONSTORM), to forecast maximum usable frequencies (MUFs) during ionospheric storms when F-region communication frequencies are negated.

== See also ==
- Sudden ionospheric disturbance (SID)
- Solar flare
- Solar particle event (SPE)
- Geomagnetic storm
- Space weather and heliophysics
- List of solar storms
