= High frequency =

3–30 MHz range of the electromagnetic spectrum

- Frequency range: 3 to 30 MHz
- Wavelength range: 100 to 10 m

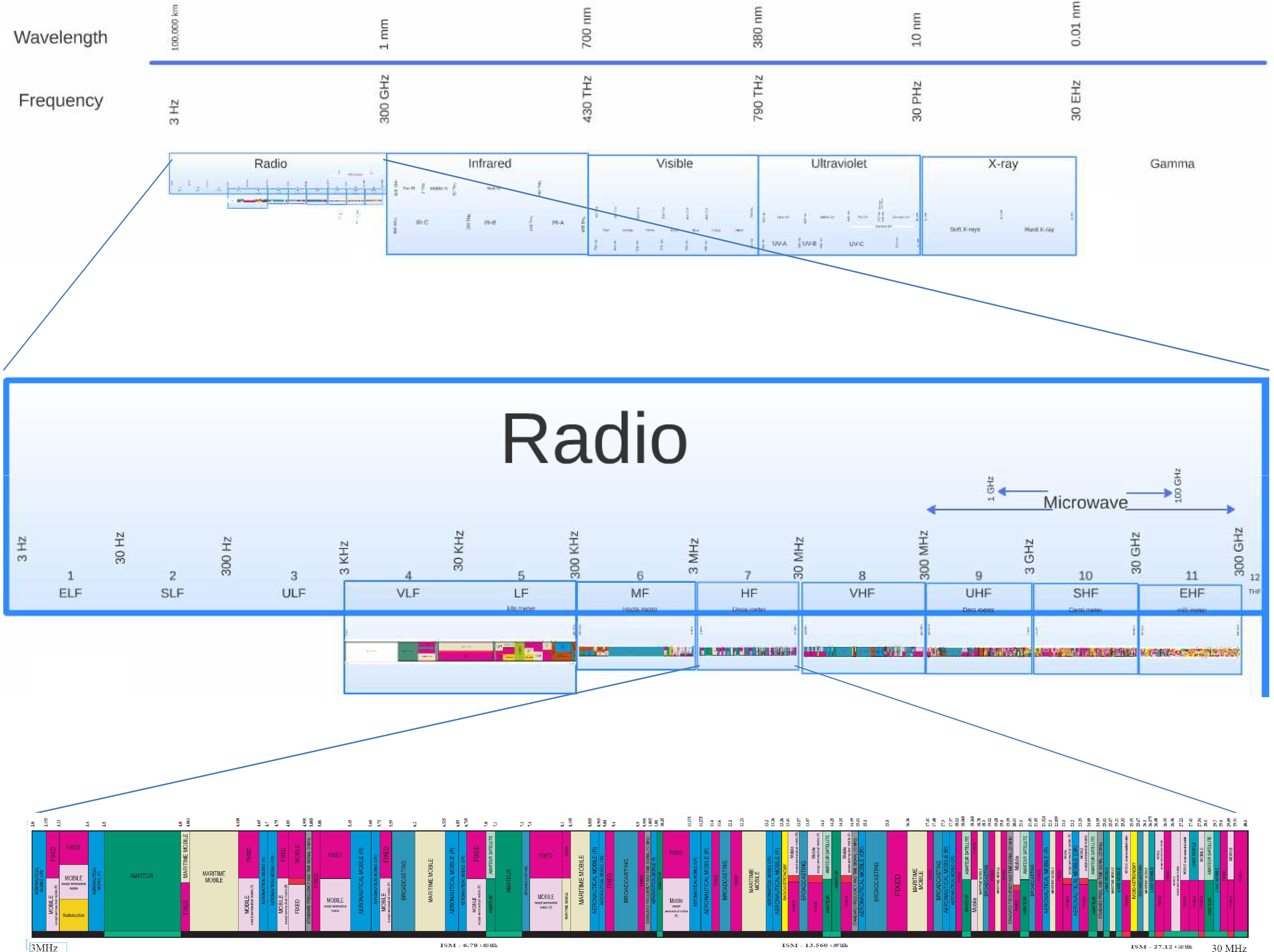
HF's position in the electromagnetic spectrum.

High frequency (HF) is the ITU designation for the band of radio waves with frequency between 3 and 30 megahertz (MHz). It is also known as the decameter band or decameter wave as its wavelengths range from one to ten decameters (ten to one hundred meters). Frequencies immediately below HF are denoted medium frequency (MF), while the next band of higher frequencies is known as the very high frequency (VHF) band. The HF band is a major part of the shortwave band of frequencies, so communication at these frequencies is often called shortwave radio. Because radio waves in this band can be reflected back to Earth by the ionosphere layer in the atmosphere – a method known as "skip" or "skywave" propagation – these frequencies can be used for long-distance communication across intercontinental distances and for mountainous terrains which prevent line-of-sight communications. The band is used by international shortwave broadcasting stations (3.95–25.82 MHz), aviation communication, government time stations, weather stations, amateur radio and citizens band services, among other uses.

== Propagation characteristics ==
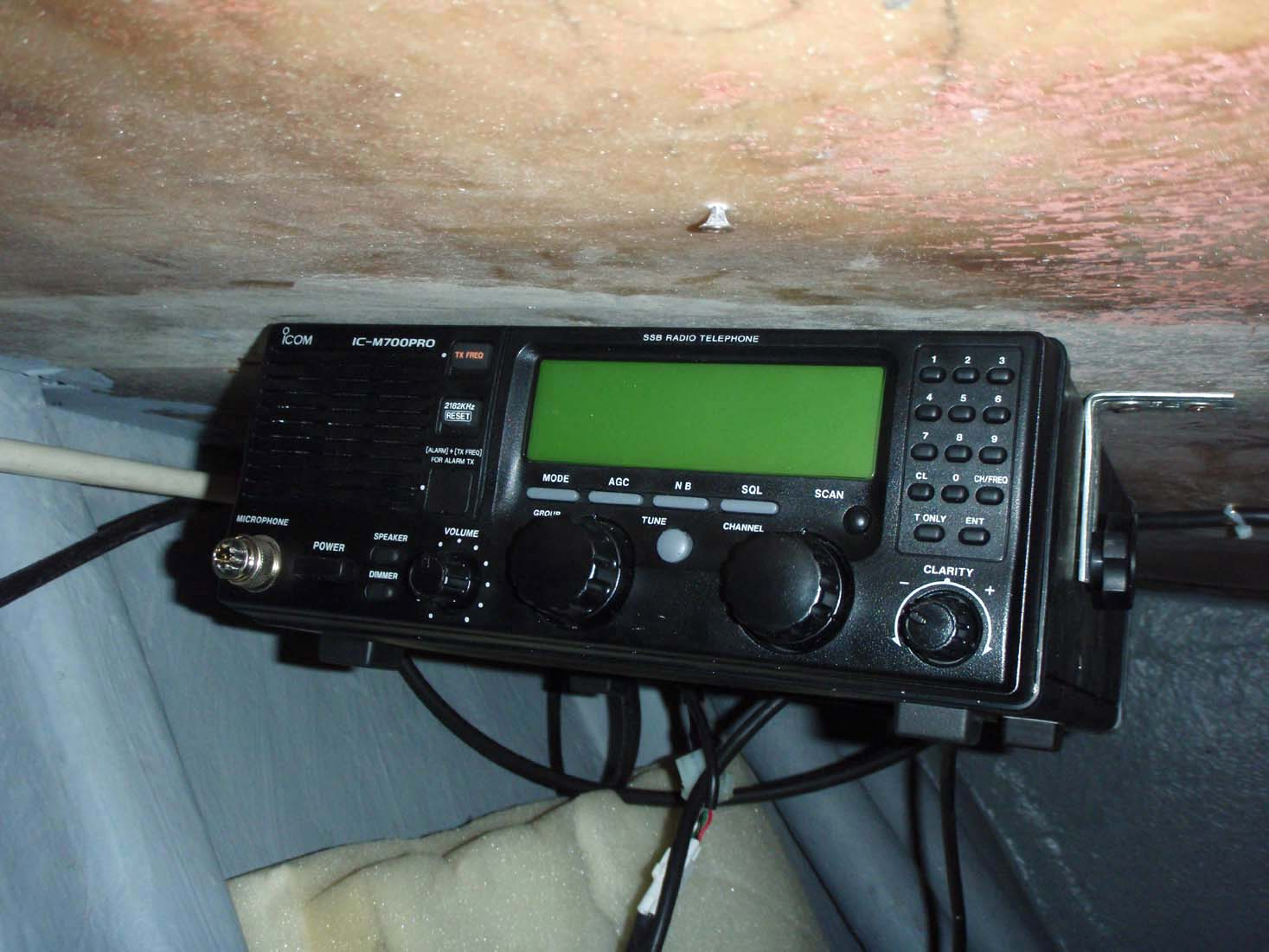
A modern Icom M700Pro two-way radio for marine HF radio communications.

The dominant means of long-distance communication in this band is skywave ("skip") propagation, in which radio waves directed at an angle into the sky refract back to Earth from layers of ionized atoms in the ionosphere. By this method HF radio waves can travel beyond the horizon, around the curve of the Earth, and can be received at intercontinental distances. However, suitability of this portion of the spectrum for such communication varies greatly with a complex combination of factors:

- Sunlight/darkness at site of transmission and reception
- Transmitter/receiver proximity to solar terminator
- Season
- Sunspot cycle
- Solar activity
- Polar aurora

At any point in time, for a given "skip" communication path between two points, the frequencies at which communication is possible are specified by these parameters:

- Maximum usable frequency (MUF)
- Lowest usable high frequency (LUF) and a
- Frequency of optimum transmission (FOT)

The maximum usable frequency regularly drops below 10 MHz in darkness during the winter months, while in summer during daylight it can easily surpass 30 MHz. It depends on the angle of incidence of the waves; it is lowest when the waves are directed straight upwards, and is higher with less acute angles. This means that at longer distances, where the waves graze the ionosphere at a very blunt angle, the MUF may be much higher. The lowest usable frequency depends on the absorption in the lower layer of the ionosphere (the D-layer). This absorption is stronger at low frequencies and is also stronger with increased solar activity (for example in daylight); total absorption often occurs at frequencies below 5 MHz during the daytime. The result of these two factors is that the usable spectrum shifts towards the lower frequencies and into the Medium Frequency (MF) range during winter nights, while on a day in full summer the higher frequencies tend to be more usable, often into the lower VHF range.

When all factors are at their optimum, worldwide communication is possible on HF. At many other times it is possible to make contact across and between continents or oceans. At worst, when a band is "dead", no communication beyond the limited groundwave paths is possible no matter what powers, antennas or other technologies are brought to bear. When a transcontinental or worldwide path is open on a particular frequency, digital, SSB and Morse code communication is possible using surprisingly low transmission powers, often of the order of milliwatts, provided suitable antennas are in use at both ends and that there is little or no artificial or natural interference. On such an open band, interference originating over a wide area affects many potential users. These issues are significant to military, safety and amateur radio users of the HF bands.

There is some propagation by ground waves, the main propagation mode in the lower bands, but transmission distance decreases with frequency due to greater absorption in the earth. At the top end of the band ground wave transmission distances are limited to 10–20 miles (15–30 km). Short range communication can occur by a combination of line-of-sight (LOC), ground bounce, and ground wave paths, but multipath interference can cause fading.

== Uses ==
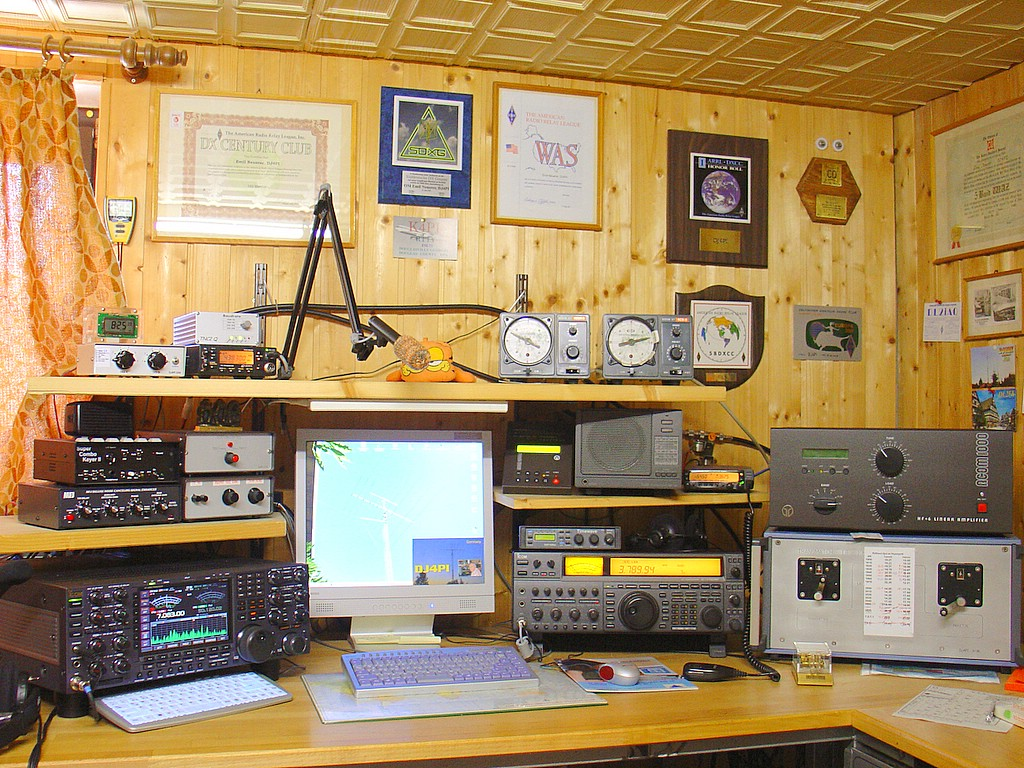
An amateur radio station incorporating two HF transceivers.

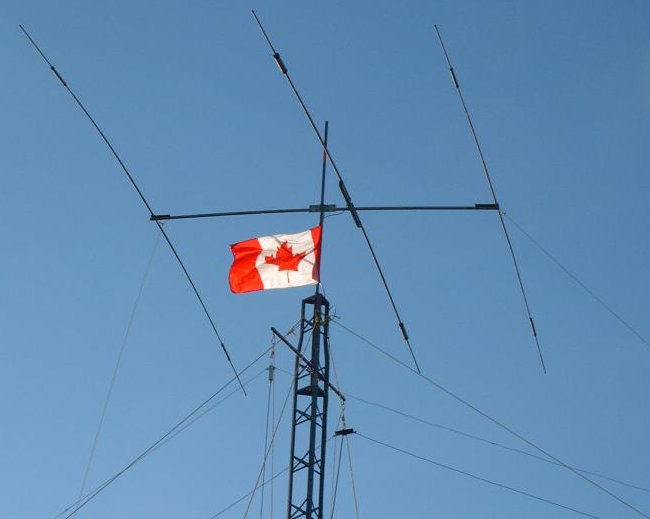
A typical Yagi antenna used by a Canadian radio amateur for long distance communication

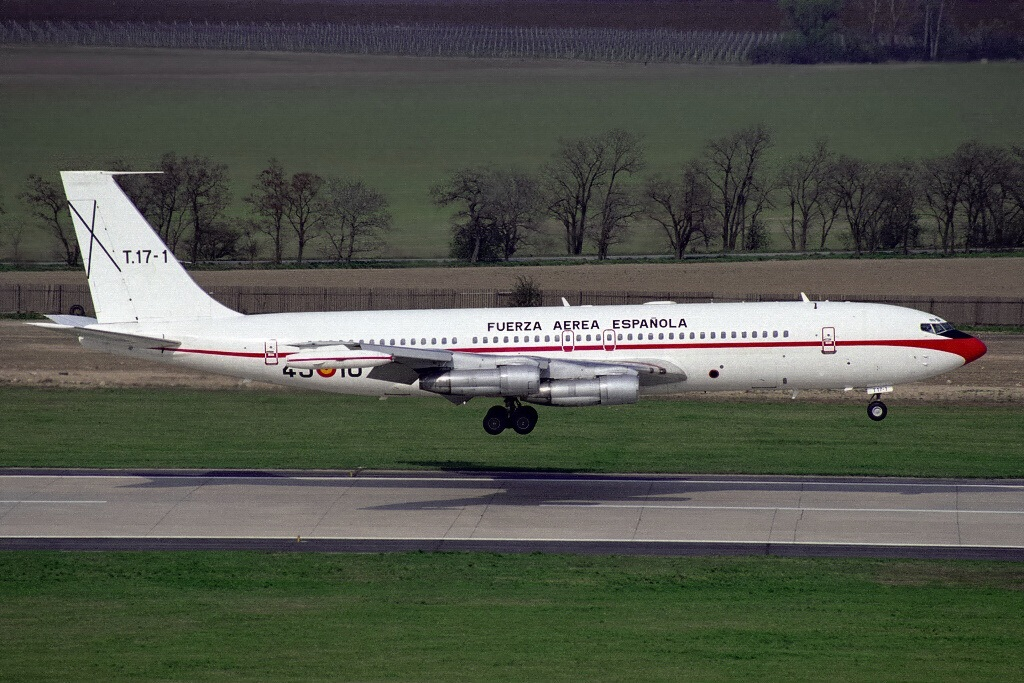
Boeing 707 used a HF antenna mounted on top of the tail fin

The main uses of the high frequency spectrum are:

- Military and governmental communication systems
- Aviation air-to-ground communications
- Amateur radio
- Shortwave international and regional broadcasting
- Maritime sea-to-shore and ship-to-ship services
- Over-the-horizon radar systems
- Global Maritime Distress and Safety System (GMDSS) communication
- Citizen's Band Radio services worldwide (generally 26-28 MHz, the higher portion of the HF band, that behaves more like low-VHF)
- Coastal ocean dynamics applications radar

The high frequency band is very popular with amateur radio operators, who can take advantage of direct, long-distance (often inter-continental) communications and the "thrill factor" resulting from making contacts in variable conditions. International shortwave broadcasting utilizes this set of frequencies, as well as a seemingly declining number of "utility" users (marine, aviation, military, and diplomatic interests), who have, in recent years, been swayed over to less volatile means of communication (for example, via satellites), but may maintain HF stations after switch-over for back-up purposes.

However, the development of Automatic Link Establishment technology based on MIL-STD-188-141 for automated connectivity and frequency selection, along with the high costs of satellite usage, have led to a renaissance in HF usage in government networks. The development of higher speed modems such as those conforming to MIL-STD-188-110C which support data rates up to 120 kilobit/s has also increased the usability of HF for data communications and video transmission. Other standards development such as STANAG 5066 provides for error free data communications through the use of ARQ protocols.

Some modes of communication, such as continuous wave Morse code transmissions (especially by amateur radio operators) and single sideband voice transmissions are more common in the HF range than on other frequencies, because of their bandwidth-conserving nature, but broadband modes, such as TV transmissions, are generally prohibited by HF's relatively small chunk of electromagnetic spectrum space.

Noise, especially man-made interference from electronic devices, tends to have a great effect on the HF bands. In recent years, concerns have risen among certain users of the HF spectrum over "broadband over power lines" (BPL) Internet access, which has an almost destructive effect on HF communications. This is due to the frequencies on which BPL operates (typically corresponding with the HF band) and the tendency for the BPL signal to leak from power lines. Some BPL providers have installed notch filters to block out certain portions of the spectrum (namely the amateur radio bands), but a great amount of controversy over the deployment of this access method remains. Other electronic devices including plasma televisions can also have a detrimental effect on the HF spectrum.

In aviation, HF communication systems are required for all trans-oceanic flights. These systems incorporate frequencies down to 2 MHz to include the 2182 kHz international distress and calling channel.

The upper section of HF (26.5-30 MHz) shares many characteristics with the lower part of VHF. The parts of this section not allocated to amateur radio are used for local communications. These include CB radios around 27 MHz, studio-to-transmitter (STL) radio links, radio control devices for models and radio paging transmitters.

Some radio frequency identification (RFID) tags utilize HF. These tags are commonly known as HFID's or HighFID's (High-Frequency Identification).

== Antennas ==
The most common antennas in this band are wire antennas such as wire dipoles or rhombic antennas; in the upper frequencies, multielement dipole antennas such as the Yagi, quad, and log-periodic antennas. Powerful shortwave broadcasting stations often use large wire curtain arrays.

Antennas for transmitting skywaves are typically made from horizontal dipoles or bottom-fed loops, both of which emit horizontally polarized waves. The preference for horizontally polarized transmission is because (approximately) only half of the signal power transmitted by an antenna travels directly into the sky; about half travels downward towards the ground and must "bounce" into the sky. For frequencies in the upper HF band, the ground is a better reflector of horizontally polarized waves, and better absorber of power from vertically polarized waves. The effect diminishes for longer wavelengths.

For receiving, random wire antennas are often used. Alternatively, the same directional antennas used for transmitting are helpful for receiving, since most noise comes from all directions, but the desired signal comes from only one direction. Long-distance (skywave) receiving antennas can generally be oriented either vertically or horizontally since refraction through the ionosphere usually scrambles signal polarization, and signals are received directly from the sky to the antenna.

The antenna should have a wide enough bandwidth to cover the desired frequency range. Broadband antennas can operate over a wider range of frequencies, while narrowband antennas are more efficient at specific frequencies.

To improve the transmit and receive sensitivity of an HF antenna, more metal parts are exposed to the air, this helps to increase the receive sensitivity. However, in places with a lot of radio signal noise, such as urban areas, the surrounding noise signals are also heard, so the design method is applied by using a directional high frequency (HF) radio antenna, or using an HF antenna in a remote area with a low HF Noise Floor level and connecting the HF transceiver.

== See also ==
- High-frequency Active Auroral Research Program
- High-frequency direction finding
- High Frequency Internet Protocol
- Radio propagation
- Space weather
- Critical frequency
