= TDR =

TDR may refer to:

== Science and technology ==
- Interstate TDR, WWII US Navy aerial drone
- Telecommunications for Disaster Relief, a proposed standard
- Time-domain reflectometry, a measuring method
  - Time-domain reflectometer

=== Medicine ===
- Radiolabeled thymidine (TdR)

== Groups and organizations ==
- The Designers Republic, a former graphic design studio in England
- Tony D'Alberto Racing, an Australian motor-racing team

== Other ==
- TDR (journal), The Drama Review
- Tokyo Disney Resort, Japan
- Timeout Detection and Recovery, Microsoft Windows video driver technique
- Transferable development rights, a method for controlling land use
- Troubled debt restructuring
