= List of radar types =

Description of radar types, purposes and specifications

This is a list of different types of radar.

== Detection and search radars ==
Search radars scan great volumes of space with pulses of short radio waves. They typically scan the volume two to four times a minute. The radio waves are usually less than a meter long. Ships and planes are metal, and reflect radio waves. The radar measures the distance to the reflector by measuring the time of the round trip from emission of a pulse to reception, dividing this by two, and then multiplying by the speed of light. To be accepted, the received pulse has to lie within a period of time called the range gate. The radar determines the direction because the short radio waves behave like a search light when emitted from the reflector of the radar set's antenna.

=== Search ===
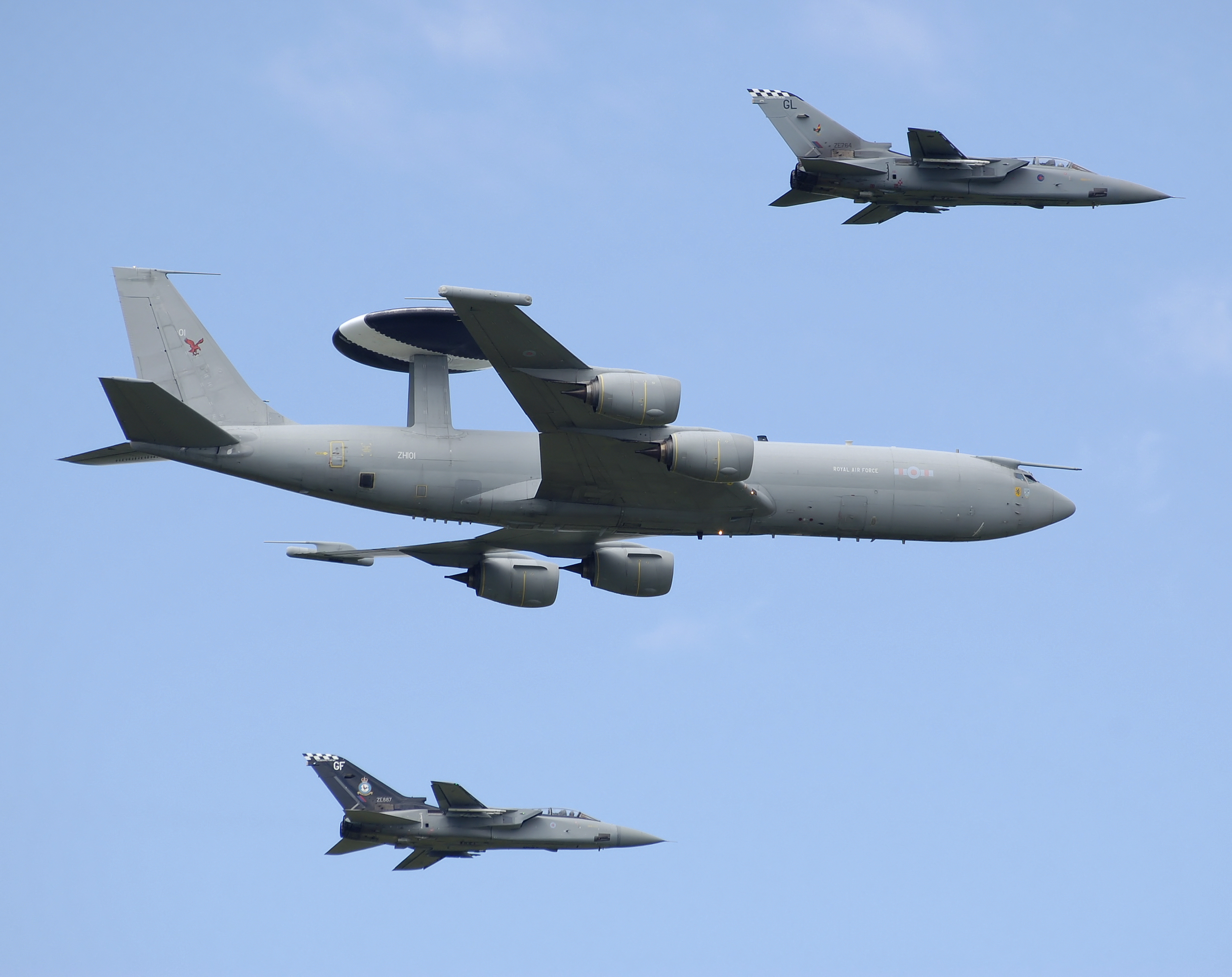
RAF Boeing E-3 Sentry AEW1 (AWACS) with rotating radar dome. The dome is 30 ft (10 m) across. The E-3 is accompanied by two Panavia Tornado F3.

- Early Warning (EW) Radar Radar Systems
  - Ground Control Intercept (GCI) Radar
  - Airborne Early Warning (AEW)
  - Airborne ground surveillance (AGS)
  - Over-the-Horizon (OTH) Radar
- Target Acquisition (TA, TAR) Radar Systems
  - Surface-to-air missile (SAM) Systems
  - Anti-Aircraft Artillery (AAA) Systems
- Surface Search (SS) Radar Systems
  - Surface Search Radar
  - Coastal Surveillance Radar
  - Harbour Surveillance Radar
  - Antisubmarine Warfare (ASW) Radar
- Height Finder (HF) Radar Systems
- Gap Filler Radar Systems

== Targeting radars ==
Targeting radars utilize the same principle but scan smaller volumes of space far more often, usually several times a second or more, while a search radar will scan a larger volume less frequently. Missile lock-on describes the scenario where a targeting radar has acquired a target, and the fire control can calculate a path for the missile to the target; in semi-active radar homing systems, this implies that the missile can "see" the target that the targeting radar is "illuminating". Some targeting radars have a range gate that can track a target, to eliminate clutter and electronic countermeasures.

=== Missile guidance systems ===
- Air-to-Air Missile (AAM)
- Air-to-Surface Missile (ASM)
- Surface-to-air missile (SAM) Systems
- Surface-to-Surface Missiles (SSM) Systems

=== Others ===
- Target Tracking (TT) Systems
  - AAA Systems
- Multi-Function Systems
  - Fire Control (FC) Systems
    - Acquisition Mode
    - Semiautomatic Tracking Mode
    - Manual Tracking Mode
  - Airborne Intercept (AI) Radars
    - Search Mode
    - TA Mode
    - TT Mode
    - Target Illumination (TI) Mode
    - Missile Guidance (MG) Mode
  - Active electronically scanned array (AESA)

=== Battlefield and reconnaissance radar ===
Military map marking symbol Radar as of NATO standard APP-6a

- Battlefield Surveillance Systems
  - Counter-battery radar
  - Battlefield Surveillance Radars
  - Tactical Radar Identification and Location System
- Countermortar/Counterbattery Systems
  - Shell Tracking Radars
- Air Mapping Systems
  - Side looking airborne radar (SLAR)
  - Synthetic Aperture Radar (SAR)
  - Perimeter Surveillance Radar (PSR)
  - Red Dawn Radar System
- Ground Surveillance Radar
- Man portable radar

== Instrumentation radars ==
Instrumentation radars are used to test aircraft, missiles, rockets, and munitions on government and private test ranges. They provide Time, Space, Position, Information (TSPI) data both for real time and post processing analysis.

Repurposed NASA and military radars

- AN/FPS-16
- MPQ-33/39
- MPA-25
- AN/FPS-134
- AN/FPS-14
- AN/TPQ-18
- AN/FPQ-17

Commercial off-the-shelf (COTS)

- Weibel MFTR series
- Weibel MSL series
- Weibel SL series

Custom

- AN/MPS-39 Multi-Object Tracking Radar (MOTR)
- TAMTS
- BAE Rule
- ROTR
- ROSA
- ROSA II
- COSIP
- Dynetics MRS

== Fuzes and triggers ==
Radar proximity fuzes are attached to anti-aircraft artillery shells or other explosive devices, and detonate the device when it approaches a large object. They use a small rapidly pulsing omnidirectional radar, usually with a powerful battery that has a long storage life, and a very short operational life. The fuzes used in anti-aircraft artillery have to be mechanically designed to accept fifty thousand g, yet still be cheap enough to throw away.

== Weather-sensing radar systems ==
Weather radars can resemble search radars. This radar uses radio waves along with horizontal, dual (horizontal and vertical), or circular polarization. The frequency selection of weather radar is a performance compromise between precipitation reflectivity and attenuation due to atmospheric water vapor. Some weather radars uses doppler shift to measure wind speeds and dual-polarization for identification of types of precipitations.

- Weather radar
- Wind profilers
- Millimetre cloud radar
- CODAR
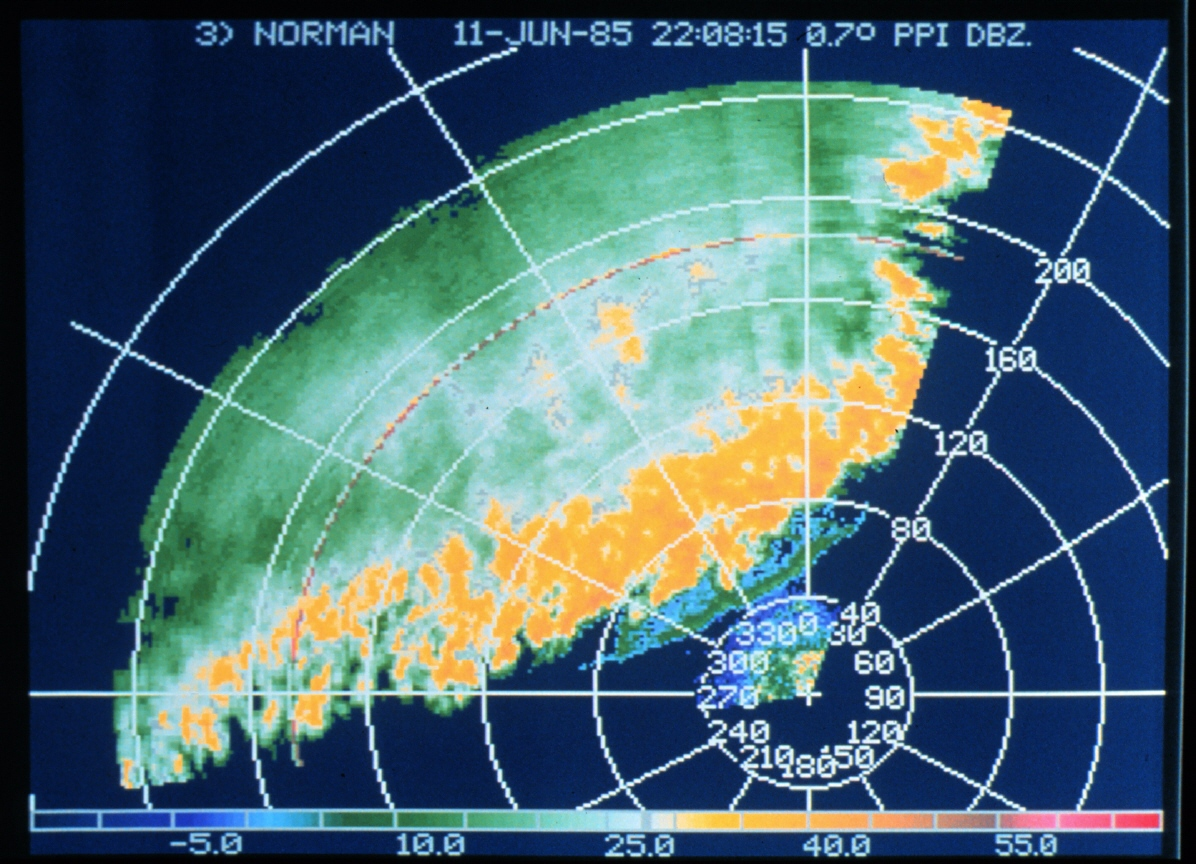
Storm front reflectivities on a weather radar screen (NOAA)

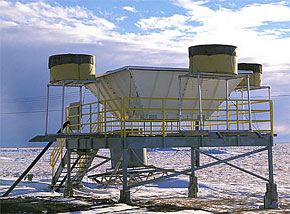
Wind profiling radar

== Navigational radars ==
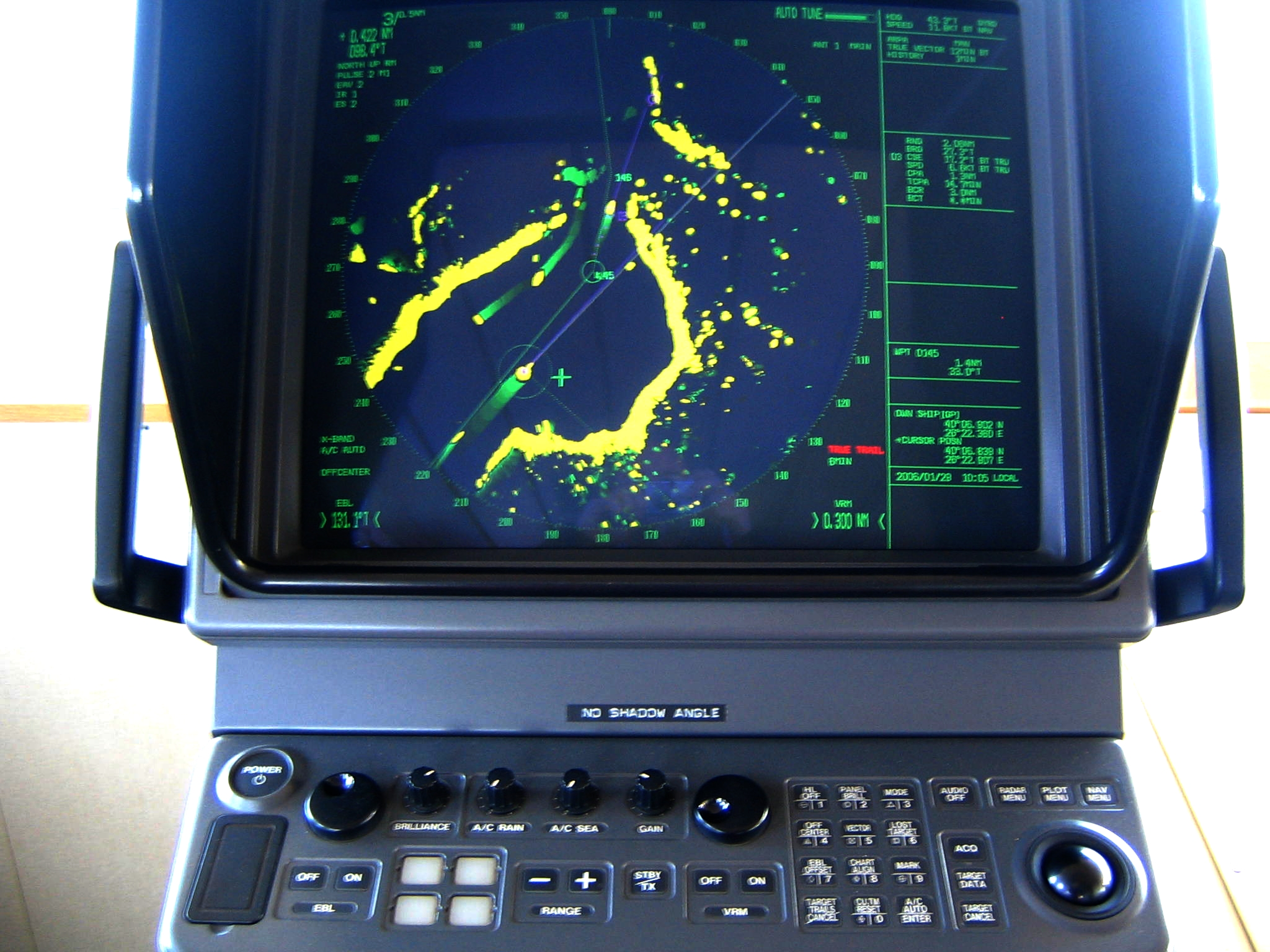
Surface search radar display commonly found on ships

Navigational radars resemble search radar, but use very short waves that reflect from earth and stone. They are common on commercial ships and long-distance commercial aircraft.

Marine radars are used by ships for collision avoidance and navigation purposes. The frequency band of radar used on most ships is X band (9 GHz/3 cm), but S band (3 GHz/10 cm) radar is also installed on most oceangoing ships to provide better detection of ships in rough sea and heavy rain condition. Vessel traffic services also use marine radars (X or S band) for tracking ARPA and provides collision avoidance or traffic regulation of ships in the surveillance area.

General purpose radars are increasingly being substituted for pure navigational radars. These generally use navigational radar frequencies, but modulate the pulse so the receiver can determine the type of surface of the reflector. The best general-purpose radars distinguish the rain of heavy storms, as well as land and vehicles. Some can superimpose sonar and map data from GPS position.

=== Air Traffic Control and navigation ===
Air traffic control uses primary and secondary radars. Primary radars are a "classical" radar which reflects all kind of echoes, including aircraft and clouds. Secondary radar emits pulses and listens for special answer of digital data emitted by an Aircraft Transponder as an answer. Transponders emit different kind of data like a 4 octal ID (mode A), the onboard calculated altitude (mode C) or the Callsign (not the flight number) (mode S). Military use transponders to establish the nationality and intention of an aircraft, so that air defenses can identify possibly hostile radar returns. This military system is called IFF (Identification Friend or Foe).

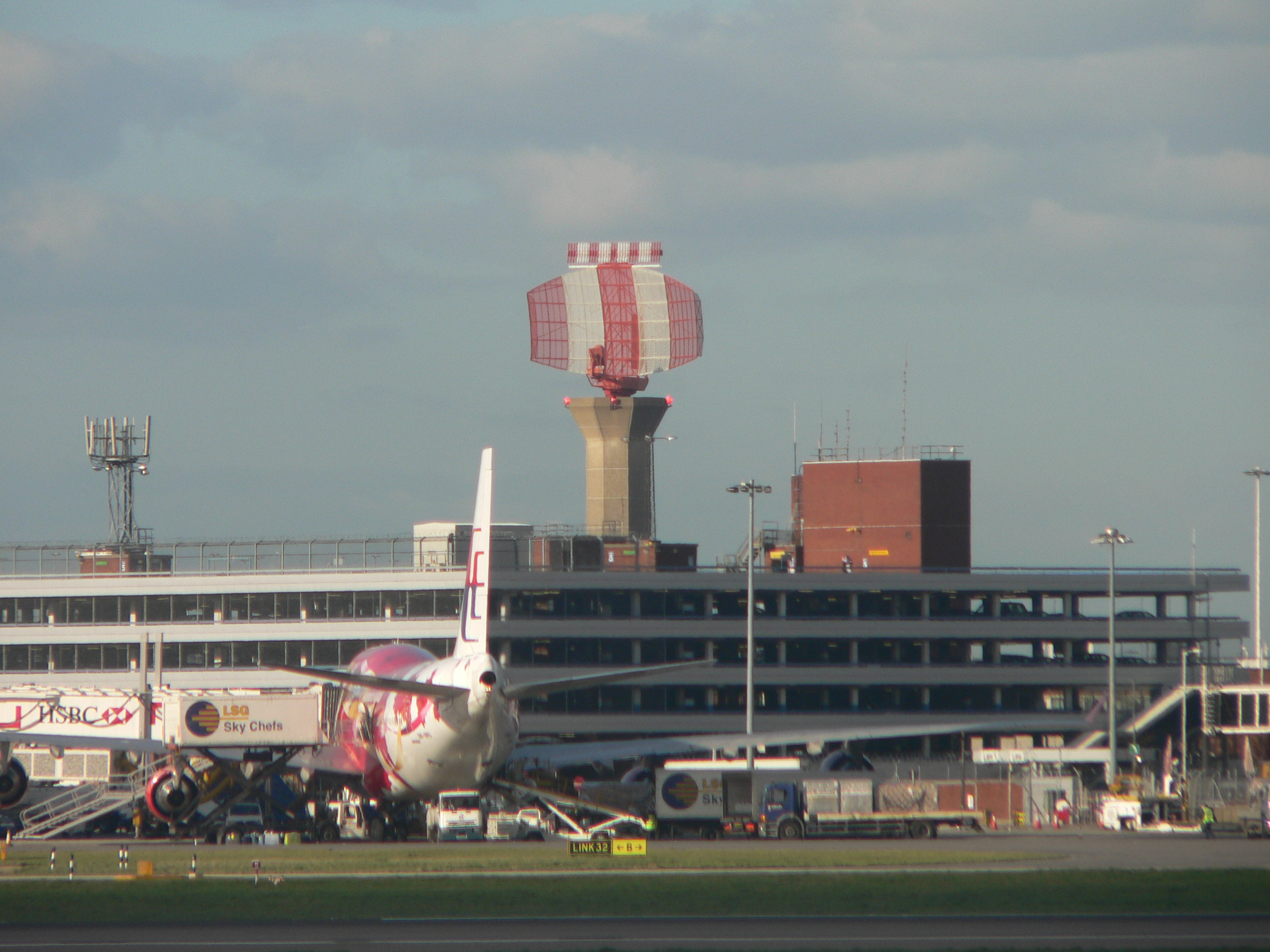
Air traffic control radar at London Heathrow Airport

- Air Traffic Control (ATC) Radars
- Secondary Surveillance Radar (SSR) (Airport Surveillance Radar)
- Ground Control Approach (GCA) Radars
- Precision Approach Radar (PAR)
- Distance Measuring Equipment (DME)
- Radio Beacons
- Radar Altimeter (RA)
- Terrain-Following Radar (TFR)

=== Space and range instrumentation radar systems ===
- Space (SP) Tracking Systems
- Range Instrumentation (RI) Systems
- Video Relay/Downlink Systems
- Space-based radar
- Incoherent scatter

== Mapping radars ==
Mapping radars are used to scan a large region for remote sensing and geography applications. They generally use synthetic aperture radar, which limits them to relatively static targets, normally terrain.

Specific radar systems can sense a human behind walls. This is possible since the reflective characteristics of humans are generally more diverse than those of the materials typically used in construction. However, since humans reflect far less radar energy than metal does, these systems require sophisticated technology to isolate human targets and moreover to process any sort of detailed image. Through-the-wall radars can be made with Ultra Wideband impulse radar, micro-Doppler radar, and synthetic aperture radar (SAR).

- Imaging radar
- 3D radar

== Speed radar ==
- Radar gun, for traffic policing and as used in some sports

== Radars for biological research ==
Radar range and wavelength can be adapted for different surveys of bird and insect migration and daily habits. They can have other uses too in the biological field.

- "MERLIN Avian Radar System for Bird Activity Monitoring and Mortality Risk Mitigation" (PDF).
- Insect radar
  - Surveillance radar (mostly X and S band, i.e. primary ATC Radars)
  - Tracking radar (mostly X band, i.e. Fire Control Systems)
- Wearable radar and miniature radar systems are used as electric seeing aids for the visually impaired, as well as early warning collision detection and situational awareness.

== See also ==
- Radar engineering details
- Automatic Radar Plotting Aid
- Low probability of intercept
- Radar scatterometer
- Radar tracker
- List of military electronics of the United States
