= HFIP =

HFIP may refer to:

- High Frequency Internet Protocol
- Hexafluoro-2-propanol
- Hurricane Forecast Intensity Project
