= Automatic link establishment =

De facto standard in radio communications

Automatic Link Establishment, commonly known as ALE, is the worldwide de facto standard for digitally initiating and sustaining HF radio communications. ALE is a feature in an HF communications radio transceiver system that enables the radio station to make contact, or initiate a circuit, between itself and another HF radio station or network of stations. The purpose is to provide a reliable rapid method of calling and connecting during constantly changing HF ionospheric propagation, reception interference, and shared spectrum use of busy or congested HF channels.

== Mechanism ==
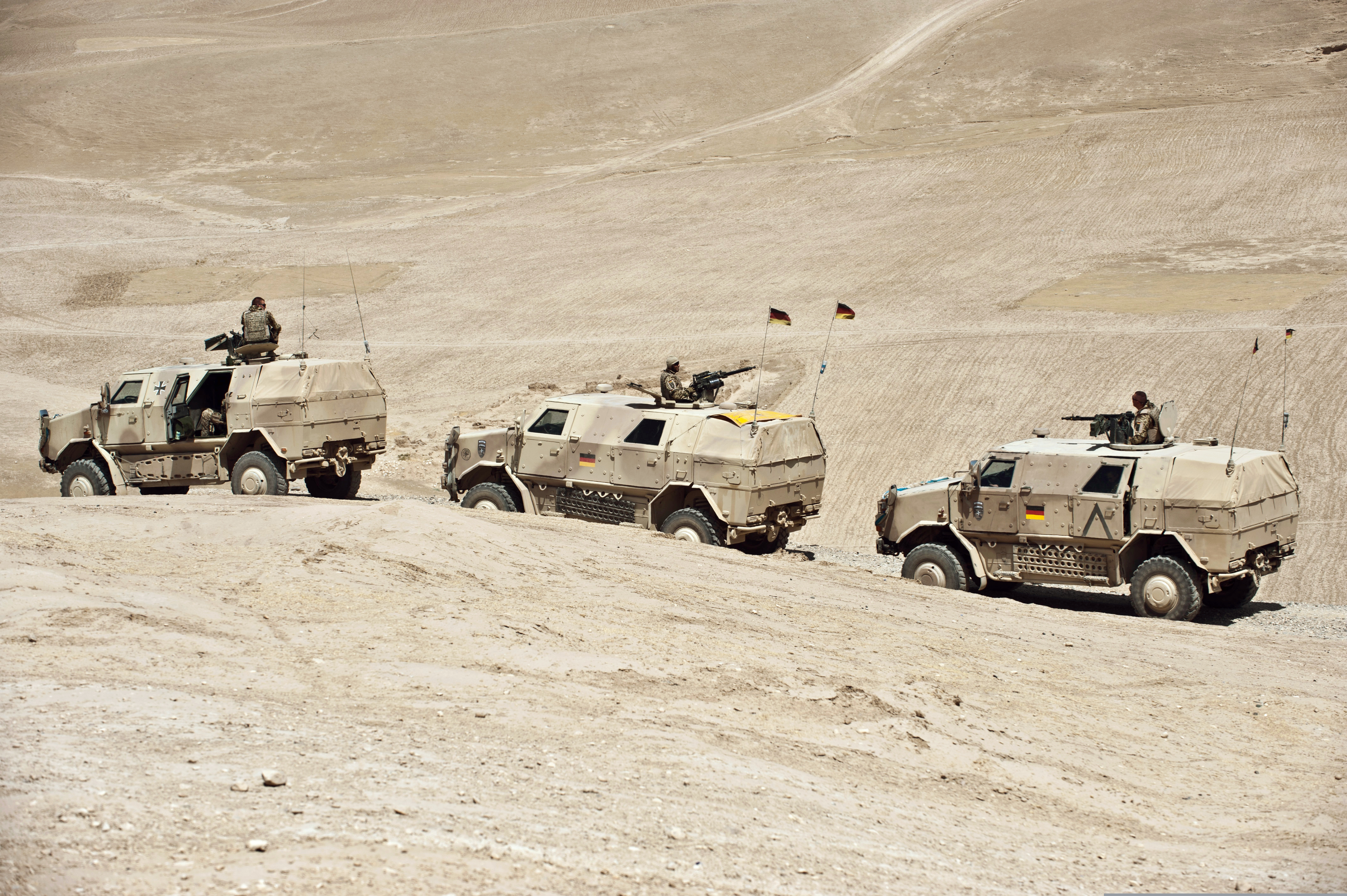
ATF Dingo of German Bundeswehr equipped with ALE capable HF-transceiver HRM-7000 in Afghanistan 2011

A standalone ALE radio combines an HF SSB radio transceiver with an internal microprocessor and MFSK modem. It is programmed with a unique ALE address, similar to a phone number (or on newer generations, a username). When not actively in contact with another station, the HF SSB transceiver constantly scans through a list of HF frequencies called channels, listening for any ALE signals transmitted by other radio stations. It decodes calls and soundings sent by other stations and uses the bit error rate to store a quality score for that frequency and sender-address.

To reach a specific station, the caller enters the ALE Address. On many ALE radios this is similar to dialing a phone number. The ALE controller selects the best available idle channel for that destination address. After confirming the channel is indeed idle, it then sends a brief selective calling signal identifying the intended recipient. When the distant scanning station detects ALE activity, it stops scanning and stays on that channel until it can confirm whether or not the call is for it. The two stations' ALE controllers automatically handshake to confirm that a link of sufficient quality has been established, then notify the operators that the link is up. If the callee fails to respond or the handshaking fails, the originating ALE node usually selects another frequency either at random or by making a guess of varying sophistication.

Upon successful linking, the receiving station generally emits an audible alarm and shows a visual alert to the operator, thus indicating the incoming call. It also indicates the callsign or other identifying information of the linked station, similar to Caller ID. The operator then un-mutes the radio and answers the call then can talk in a regular conversation or negotiates a data link using voice or the ALE built-in short text message format. Alternatively, digital data can be exchanged via a built-in or external modem (such as a STANAG 5066 or MIL-STD-188-110B serial tone modem) depending on needs and availability. The ALE built-in text messaging facility can be used to transfer short text messages as an "orderwire" to allow operators to coordinate external equipment such as phone patches or non-embedded digital links, or for short tactical messages.

== Common applications ==
An ALE radio system enables connection for voice conversation, alerting, data exchange, texting, instant messaging, email, file transfer, image, geo-position tracking, or telemetry. With a radio operator initiating a call, the process normally takes a few minutes for the ALE to pick an HF frequency that is optimum for both sides of the communication link. It signals the operators audibly and visually on both ends, so they can begin communicating with each other immediately. In this respect, the longstanding need in HF radio for repetitive calling on pre-determined time schedules or tedious monitoring static is eliminated. It is useful as a tool for finding optimum channels to communicate between stations in real-time. In modern HF communications, ALE has largely replaced HF prediction charts, propagation beacons, chirp sounders, propagation prediction software, and traditional radio operator educated guesswork. ALE is most commonly used for hooking up operators for voice contacts on SSB (single-sideband modulation), HF internet connectivity for email, SMS phone texting or text messaging, real-time chat via HF text, Geo Position Reporting, and file transfer. High Frequency Internet Protocol or HFIP may be used with ALE for internet access via HF.

== Techniques ==
The essence of ALE techniques is the use of automatic channel selection, scanning receivers, selective calling, handshaking, and robust burst modems. An ALE node decodes all received ALE signals heard on the channel(s) it monitors. It uses the fact that all ALE messages use forward error correction (FEC) redundancy. By noting how much error-correction occurred in each received and decoded message, an ALE node can detect the "quality" of the path between the sending station and itself. This information is coupled with the ALE address of the sending node and the channel the message was received on, and stored in the node's Link Quality Analysis (LQA) memory. When a call is initiated, the LQA lookup table is searched for matches involving the target ALE address and the best historic channel is used to call the target station. This reduces the likelihood that the call has to be repeated on alternate frequencies. Once the target station has heard the call and responded, a bell or other signalling device will notify both operators that a link has been established. At this point, the operators may coordinate further communication via orderwire text messages, voice, or other means. If further digital communication is desired, it may take place via external data modems or via optional modems built into the ALE terminal.

This unusual usage of FEC redundancy is the primary innovation that differentiates ALE from previous selective calling systems which either decoded a call or failed to decode due to noise or interference. A binary outcome of "Good enough" or not gave no way of automatically choosing between two channels, both of which are currently good enough for minimum communications. The redundancy-based scoring inherent in ALE thus allows for selecting the "best" available channel and (in more advanced ALE nodes) using all decoded traffic over some time window to sort channels into a list of decreasing probability-to-contact, significantly reducing co-channel interference to other users as well as dramatically decreasing the time needed to successfully link with the target node.

Techniques used in the ALE standard include automatic signaling, automatic station identification (sounding), polling, message store-and-forward, linking protection and anti-spoofing to prevent hostile denial of service by ending the channel scanning process. Optional ALE functions include polling and the exchange of orderwire commands and messages. The orderwire message, known as AMD (Automatic Message Display), is the most commonly used text transfer method of ALE, and the only universal method that all ALE controllers have in common for displaying text. It is common for vendors to offer extensions to AMD for various non-standard features, although dependency on these extensions undermines interoperability. As in all interoperability scenarios, care should be taken to determine if this is acceptable before using such extensions.

== History and precedents ==
ALE evolved from older HF radio selective calling technology. It combined existing channel-scanning selective calling concepts with microprocessors (enabling FEC decoding and quality scoring decisions), burst transmissions (minimizing co-channel interference), and transponding (allowing unattended operation and incoming-call signalling). Early ALE systems were developed in the late 1970s and early 1980s by several radio manufacturers. The first ALE-family controller units were external rack mounted controllers connected to control military radios, and were rarely interoperable across vendors.

Various methods and proprietary digital signaling protocols were used by different manufacturers in first generation ALE, leading to incompatibility. Later, a cooperative effort among manufacturers and the US government resulted in a second generation of ALE that included the features of first generation systems, while improving performance. The second generation 2G ALE system standard in 1986, MIL-STD-188-141A, was adopted in FED-STD-1045 for US federal entities. In the 1980s, military and other entities of the US government began installing early ALE units, using ALE controller products built primarily by US companies. The primary application during the first 10 years of ALE use was government and military radio systems, and the limited customer base combined with the necessity to adhere to MILSPEC standards kept prices extremely high. Over time, demand for ALE capabilities spread and by the late 1990s, most new government HF radios purchased were designed to meet at least the minimum ALE interoperability standard, making them eligible for use with standard ALE node gear. Radios implementing at least minimum ALE node functionality as an option internal to the radio became more common and significantly more affordable. As the standards were adopted by other governments worldwide, more manufacturers produced competitively priced HF radios to meet this demand. The need to interoperate with government organizations prompted many non-government organizations (NGOs) to at least partially adopt ALE standards for communication. As non-military experience spread and prices came down, other civilian entities started using 2G ALE. By the year 2000, there were enough civilian and government organizations worldwide using ALE that it became a de facto HF interoperability standard for situations where a priori channel and address coordination is possible.

In the late 1990s, a third generation 3G ALE with significantly improved capability and performance was included in MIL-STD-188-141B, retaining backward compatibility with 2G ALE, and was adopted in NATO STANAG 4538. Civilian and non-government adoption rates are much lower than 2G ALE due to the extreme cost as compared to surplus or entry-level 2G gear as well as the significantly increased system and planning complexity necessary to realize the benefits inherent in the 3G specification. For many militaries, whose needs for maximized intra-organizational capability and capacity always strain existing systems, the additional cost and complexity of 3G are less problematic.

=== Reliability ===
ALE enables rapid unscheduled communication and message passing without requiring complex message centers, multiple radios and antennas, or highly trained operators. With the removal of these potential sources of failure, the tactical communication process becomes much more robust and reliable. The effects extend beyond mere force multiplication of existing communications methods; units such as helicopters, when outfitted with ALE radios, can now reliably communicate in situations where the crew are too busy to operate a traditional non-line of sight radio. This ability to enable tactical communication in conditions where dedicated trained operators and hardware are inappropriate is often considered to be the true improvement offered by ALE.

ALE is a critical path toward increased interoperability between organizations. By enabling a station to participate nearly simultaneously in many different HF networks, ALE allows for convenient cross-organization message passing and monitoring without requiring dedicated separate equipment and operators for each partner organization. This dramatically reduces staffing and equipment considerations, while enabling small mobile or portable stations to participate in multiple networks and subnetworks. The result is increased resilience, decreased fragility, increased ability to communicate information effectively, and the ability to rapidly add to or replace communication points as the situation demands.

When combined with Near Vertical Incidence Skywave (NVIS) techniques and sufficient channels spread across the spectrum, an ALE node can provide greater than 95% success linking on the first call, nearly on par with SATCOM systems. This is significantly more reliable than cellphone infrastructure during disasters or wars yet is mostly immune to such considerations itself.

== Standards and protocols ==
Global standards for ALE are based on the original US MIL-STD 188-141A and FED-1045, known as 2nd Generation (2G) ALE. 2G ALE uses non-synchronised scanning of channels, and it takes several seconds to half a minute to repeatedly scan through an entire list of channels looking for calls. Thus it requires sufficient duration of transmission time for calls to connect or link with another station that is unsynchronised with its calling signal. The vast majority of ALE systems in use in the world at the present time are 2G ALE.

=== 2G technical characteristics ===
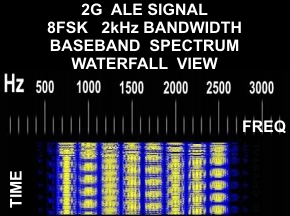
2G ALE Signal

The more common 2G ALE signal waveform is designed to be compatible with standard 3 kHz SSB narrowband voice channel transceivers. The modulation method is 8ary Frequency Shift Keying or 8FSK, also sometimes called Multi Frequency Shift Keying MFSK, with eight orthogonal tones between 750 and 2500 Hz. Each tone is 8 ms long, resulting in a transmitted over-the-air symbol rate of 125 baud or 125 symbols per second, with a raw data rate of 375 bits per second. The ALE data is formatted in 24-bit frames, which consist of a 3-bit preamble followed by three ASCII characters, each seven bits long. The received signal is usually decoded using digital signal processing techniques that are capable of recovering the 8FSK signal at a negative decibel signal-to-noise ratio (i.e., the signal may be recovered even when it is below the noise level). The over-the-air layers of the protocol involve the use of forward error correction, redundancy, and handshaking transponding similar to those used in ARQ techniques.

=== 3G technical characteristics ===
Newer standards of ALE, called 3rd Generation or 3G ALE, use accurate time synchronization (via a defined time-synch protocol as well as the option of GPS-locked clocks) to achieve faster and more dependable linking. Through synchronization, the calling time to achieve a link may be reduced to less than 10 seconds. The 3G ALE modem signal also provides better robustness and can work in channel conditions that are less favorable than 2G ALE. Dwell groups, limited callsigns, and shorter burst transmissions enable more rapid intervals of scanning. All stations in the same group scan and receive each channel at precisely the same time window. Although 3G ALE is more reliable and has significantly enhanced channel-time efficiency, the existence of a large installed base of 2G ALE radio systems and the wide availability of moderately priced (often military surplus) equipment, has made 2G the baseline standard for global interoperability.

== Basis for HF interoperability communications ==
Interoperability is a critical issue for the disparate entities which use radiocommunications to fulfill the needs of organizations. Largely due to the ubiquity of 2G ALE, it became the primary method for providing interoperability on HF between governmental and non-governmental disaster relief and emergency communications entities, and amateur radio volunteers. With digital techniques increasingly employed in communications equipment, a universal digital calling standard was needed, and ALE filled the gap. Nearly every major HF radio manufacturer in the world builds ALE radios to the 2G standard to meet the high demand that new installations of HF radio systems conform to this standard protocol. Disparate entities that historically used incompatible radio methods were then able to call and converse with each other using the common 2G ALE platform. Some manufacturers and organizations have used the AMD feature of ALE to expand the performance and connectivity. In some cases, this has been successful, and in other cases, the use of proprietary preamble or embedded commands has led to interoperability problems.

=== Tactical communication and resource management ===
ALE serves as a convenient method of beyond line of sight communication. Originally developed to support military requirements, ALE is useful to many organizations who find themselves managing widely located units. United States Immigration and Customs Enforcement and United States Coast Guard are two members of the Customs Over the Horizon Enforcement Network (COTHEN), a MIL-STD 188-141A ALE network. All U.S. armed forces operate multiple similar networks. Similarly, shortwave utility listeners have documented frequency and callsign lists for many nations' military and guard units, as well as networks operated by oil exploration and production companies and public utilities in many countries.

=== Emergency / disaster relief or extraordinary situation response communications ===
ALE radio communication systems for both HF regional area networks and HF interoperability communications are in service among emergency and disaster relief agencies as well as military and guard forces. Extraordinary response agencies and organizations use ALE to respond to situations in the world where conventional communications may have been temporarily overloaded or damaged. In many cases, it is in place as alternative back-channel for organizations that may have to respond to situations or scenarios involving the loss of conventional communications. Earthquakes, storms, volcanic eruptions, and power or communication infrastructure failures are typical situations in which organizations may deem ALE necessary to operations. ALE networks are common among organizations engaged in extraordinary situation response such as: natural and man-made disasters, transportation, power, or telecommunication network failures, war, peacekeeping, or stability operations. Organizations known to use ALE for Emergency management, disaster relief, ordinary communication or extraordinary situation response include: Red Cross, FEMA, Disaster Medical Assistance Teams, NATO, Federal Bureau of Investigation, United Nations, AT&T, Civil Air Patrol, SHARES, State of California Emergency Management Agency (CalEMA), other US States' Offices of Emergency Services or Emergency Management Agencies, and Amateur Radio Emergency Service (ARES).

=== International HF telecommunications for disaster relief ===
The International Telecommunication Union (ITU), in response to the need for interoperation in international disaster response spurred largely by humanitarian relief, included ALE in its Telecommunications for Disaster Relief recommendations. The increasing need for instant connectivity for logistical and tactical disaster relief response communications, such as the 2004 Indian Ocean earthquake tsunami led to ITU actions of encouragement to countries around the world toward loosening restrictions on such communications and equipment border transit during catastrophic disasters. The IARU Global Amateur Radio Emergency Communications Conferences (GAREC) and IARU Global Simulated Emergency Tests have included ALE.

== Use in amateur radio ==
Amateur radio operators began sporadic ALE operation on a limited basis in the early to mid-1990s, with commercial ALE radios and ALE controllers. In 2000, the first widely available software ALE controller for the Personal Computer, PCALE, became available, and hams started to set up stations based on it. In 2001, the first organized and coordinated global ALE nets for International Amateur Radio began. In August 2005, ham radio operators supporting communications for emergency Red Cross shelters used ALE for Disaster Relief operations during the Hurricane Katrina disaster. After the event, hams developed more permanent ALE emergency/disaster relief networks, including internet connectivity, with a focus on interoperation between organizations. The amateur radio HFLink Automatic Link Establishment system uses an open net protocol to enable all amateur radio operators and amateur radio nets worldwide to participate in ALE and share the same ALE channels legally and interoperably. Amateur radio operators may use it to call each other for voice or data communications.

=== Amateur radio interoperability adaptations ===
Amateur radio operators commonly provide local, regional, national, and international emergency / disaster relief communications. The need for interoperability on HF led to the adoption of ALE open networks by hams. Amateur radio adapted 2G ALE techniques, by using the common denominators of the 2G ALE protocol, with a limited subset of features found in the majority of all ALE radios and controllers. Each amateur radio ALE station uses the operator's call sign as the address, also known as the ALE Address, in the ALE radio controller. The lowest common denominator technique enables any manufacturer's ALE radios or software to be used for HF interoperability communications and networking. Known as Ham-Friendly ALE, the amateur radio ALE standard is used to establish radio communications, through a combination of active ALE on internationally recognized automatic data frequencies, and passive ALE scanning on voice channels. In this technique, active ALE frequencies include pseudorandom periodic polite station identification, while passive ALE frequencies are silently scanned for selective calling. ALE systems include Listen Before Transmit as a standard function, and in most cases this feature provides better busy channel detection of voice and data signals than the human ear. Ham-Friendly ALE technique is also known as 2.5G ALE, because it maintains 2G ALE compatibility while employing some of the adaptive channel management features of 3G ALE, but without the accurate GPS time synchronization of 3G ALE.

=== Disaster relief HF network ===
Hot standby ALE nets are in constant operation 24/7/365 for International Emergency and Disaster Relief communications. The Ham Radio Global ALE High Frequency Network, which began service in June 2007, is the world's largest intentionally open ALE network. It is a free open network staffed by volunteers, and used by amateur radio operators supporting disaster relief organizations.

=== International coordination ===
International amateur radio ALE High Frequency channels are frequency coordinated with all Regions of the International Amateur Radio Union (IARU entity of ITU), for international, regional, national, and local use in the Amateur Radio Service. All Amateur Radio ALE channels use "USB" Upper Sideband standard. Different rules, regulations, and bandplans of the region and local country of operation apply to use of various channels. Some channels may not be available in every country. Primary or global channels are in common with most countries and regions.

==== International channels ====
This listing is current as of February 2020.

Frequency kHz	Mode	ALE or Selcall	Channel Number	Channel Label	North America Net	Europe Net	UK Net	Japan Net	Australia- NZ Net	ITU Region 1 Net	ITU Region 2 Net	ITU Region 3 Net	Preamble Time (seconds)
00473.0	USB	SEL	00A	00ASEL	HFS	HFS	HFS	HFS	HFS	HFS	HFS	HFS	15.0
00475.5	USB	ALE	00B	00BALE	HFL	HFL	HFL	HFL	HFL	HFL	HFL	HFL	15.0
01838.0	USB	SEL	01A	01ASEL	HFR	HFR	HFS		HFS	HFR	HFR	HFR	15.0
01843.0	USB	ALE	01B	01BALE	HFN	HFL	HFL		HFL	HFL	HFL	HFL	15.0
01908.0	USB	SEL	01C	01CSEL				HFS				HFS	15.0
01909.0	USB	ALE	01D	01DALE				HFL				HFL	15.0
01990.0	USB	SEL	01E	01ESEL	HFS	HFS				HFS	HFS		15.0
01996.0	USB	ALE	01F	01FALE	HFL	HFN					HFL		15.0
03527.0	USB	ALE	03A	03AALE				HFN					15.0
03529.0	USB	SEL	03B	03BSEL				HFR					15.0
03590.0	USB	SEL	03C	03CSEL	HFR	HFR	HFR		HFR	HFR	HFR	HFR	15.0
03596.0	USB	ALE	03D	03DALE	HFN	HFN	HFN		HFN	HFN	HFN	HFN	15.0
03600.5	USB	ALE	03E	03EALE				HFL	HFL			HFL	15.0
03605.0	USB	SEL	03F	03FSEL				HFS	HFS			HFS	15.0
03710.0	USB	SEL	03G	03GSEL						HFX	HFX	HFX	15.0
03791.0	USB	ALE	03H	03HALE		HFL	HFL			HFL	HFL		15.0
03795.0	USB	SEL	03I	03ISEL		HFS	HFS			HFS	HFS	HFS	15.0
03845.0	USB	SEL	03J	03JSEL	HFS								15.0
03995.0	USB	SEL	03K	03KSEL	HFS								15.0
03996.0	USB	ALE	03L	03LALE	HFL								15.0
05102.0	USB	SEL	05A	05ASEL					HFX				15.0
05346.5	USB	SEL	05B	05BSEL	HFR								15.0
05354.5	USB	ALE	05C	05CALE		HFL	HFL			HFL	HFL	HFL	15.0
05355.0	USB	SEL	05D	05DSEL		HFR	HFR			HFR	HFR	HFR	15.0
05357.0	USB	ALE	05E	05EALE	HFL	HFL				HFL	HFL	HFL	15.0
05363.0	USB	SEL	05F	05FSEL		HFS				HFS	HFS	HFS	15.0
05371.5	USB	ALE	05G	05GALE	HFL		HFL						15.0
05403.5	USB	SEL	05H	05HSEL	HFS		HFS						15.0
07044.0	USB	SEL	07A	07ASEL		HFR	HFR	HFR	HFR	HFR	HFR	HFR	15.0
07049.5	USB	ALE	07B	07BALE		HFL	HFL			HFL	HFL	HFL	15.0
07100.0	USB	SEL	07C	07CSEL	HFR								15.0
07102.0	USB	ALE	07D	07DALE	HFN	HFN	HFN	HFN	HFN	HFN	HFN	HFN	15.0
07185.0	USB	ALE	07E	07EALE		HFL	HFL	HFL	HFL	HFL	HFL	HFL	15.0
07195.0	USB	SEL	07F	07FSEL	HFS	HFS	HFS	HFS	HFS	HFS	HFS	HFS	15.0
07291.0	USB	SEL	07G	07GSEL	HFS								15.0
07296.0	USB	ALE	07H	07HALE	HFL								15.0
10126.0	USB	SEL	10A	10ASEL					HFS	HFS		HFS	15.0
10131.0	USB	ALE	10B	10BALE					HFL	HFL		HFL	15.0
10144.0	USB	SEL	10C	10CSEL	HFR	HFR	HFR	HFR	HFR	HFR	HFR	HFR	15.0
10145.5	USB	ALE	10D	10DALE	HFN	HFN	HFN	HFN	HFN	HFN	HFN	HFN	15.0
14094.0	USB	SEL	14A	14ASEL	HFR	HFR	HFR	HFR	HFR	HFR	HFR	HFR	15.0
14109.0	USB	ALE	14B	14BALE	HFN	HFN	HFN	HFN	HFN	HFN	HFN	HFN	15.0
14122.0	USB	SEL	14C	14CSEL						HFX	HFX	HFX	15.0
14343.0	USB	SEL	14D	14DSEL	HFS	HFS	HFS	HFS	HFS	HFS	HFS	HFS	15.0
14346.0	USB	ALE	14E	14EALE	HFL	HFL	HFL	HFL	HFL	HFL	HFL	HFL	15.0
18106.0	USB	ALE	18A	18AALE	HFN	HFN	HFN	HFN	HFN	HFN	HFN	HFN	15.0
18107.0	USB	SEL	18B	18BSEL	HFR	HFR	HFR	HFR	HFR	HFR	HFR	HFR	15.0
18113.0	USB	SEL	18C	18CSEL						HFX	HFX	HFX	15.0
18117.5	USB	ALE	18D	18DALE	HFL	HFL	HFL	HFL	HFL	HFL	HFL	HFL	15.0
18163.0	USB	SEL	18E	18ESEL	HFS	HFS	HFS	HFS	HFS	HFS	HFS	HFS	15.0
21094.0	USB	SEL	21A	21ASEL	HFR	HFR	HFR	HFR	HFR	HFR	HFR	HFR	15.0
21096.0	USB	ALE	21B	21BALE	HFN	HFN	HFN	HFN	HFN	HFN	HFN	HFN	15.0
21228.0	USB	SEL	21C	21CSEL						HFX	HFX	HFX	15.0
21427.0	USB	SEL	21D	21DSEL	HFS	HFS	HFS	HFS	HFS	HFS	HFS	HFS	15.0
21432.5	USB	ALE	21E	21EALE	HFL	HFL	HFL	HFL	HFL	HFL	HFL	HFL	15.0
24924.0	USB	SEL	24A	24ASEL	HFR	HFR	HFR	HFR	HFR	HFR	HFR	HFR	15.0
24926.0	USB	ALE	24B	24BALE	HFN	HFN	HFN	HFN	HFN	HFN	HFN	HFN	15.0
24932.0	USB	ALE	24C	24CALE	HFL	HFL	HFL	HFL	HFL	HFL	HFL	HFL	15.0
24977.0	USB	SEL	24D	24DSEL	HFS	HFS	HFS	HFS	HFS	HFS	HFS	HFS	15.0
28143.0	USB	SEL	28A	28ASEL	HFR	HFR	HFR	HFR	HFR	HFR	HFR	HFR	15.0
28146.0	USB	ALE	28B	28BALE	HFN	HFN	HFN	HFN	HFN	HFN	HFN	HFN	15.0
28305.0	USB	SEL	28C	28CSEL	HFS	HFS	HFS	HFS	HFS	HFS	HFS	HFS	15.0
28312.5	USB	ALE	28D	28DALE	HFL	HFL	HFL	HFL	HFL	HFL	HFL	HFL	15.0
29520.0	FM	SEL	29A	29ASEL	HFM	HFM	HFM	HFM	HFM	HFM	HFM	HFM	6.0

Frequency table notes: Automatic Link Establishment ALE channel frequencies in the Amateur Radio Service are internationally coordinated with selective calling Selcall channels for interoperability purposes. Net is the ALE net address or Selcall net name.

==== Standard configurations ====
Note	Configuration	Standard
1	ALE System	MIL-STD 188-141B; FED-1045 (8FSK, 2 kHz bandwidth)
2	Transmission duration	Calling optimum 15 seconds; or preamble 15 seconds.
3	Scan rate	1, 2, or 5 channels per second. Minimum dwell time 120 milliseconds per channel for ALE and 300 milliseconds for selcall.
4	Sounding Interval	60 Minutes or more (for same channel)
5	Audio Centre Frequency	1625 Hz for digital mode text and data
6	Messaging standard	AMD (Automatic Message Display) Universal short texting
7	Sounding Type	TWS Sounding (This Was Sound)
8	Tune Time	3000 milliseconds or approximately 3 seconds

==== International nets ====
NET	Protocol	Content	Status	Sounding	Net Slots	Purpose
HFL	ALE	Voice	Open	Manual	3	Normal communications and emergency
HFN	ALE	Texting	Open	Auto 1 hour	3	Normal communications
HFR	Selcall	Texting	Open	Auto 1 hour	1	Normal communications
HFS	Selcall	Voice	Open	Manual	1	Normal communications and emergency
HFM	Selcall	Texting or Voice	Open	Manual	1	Normal communications
HFX	ALE or Selcall	Texting or Voice	Open	Manual	1	Inactive or auxiliary frequencies

== Web links ==
- Website HFN-ALE-Net
- Website of the openALE Initiative for Amateur Radio openALE - professional-grade HF radio ALE implementation
- Blog Article on Company Website KNL’s ALE HF radio
- MIL-STD-188-141D on RapidM Corporate Website

== See also ==
- Multiple frequency-shift keying
- Selective calling
- Amateur radio
- Amateur radio emergency communications
- ARES
