= Polar (satellite) =

NASA science spacecraft which studied the polar magnetosphere until 2008

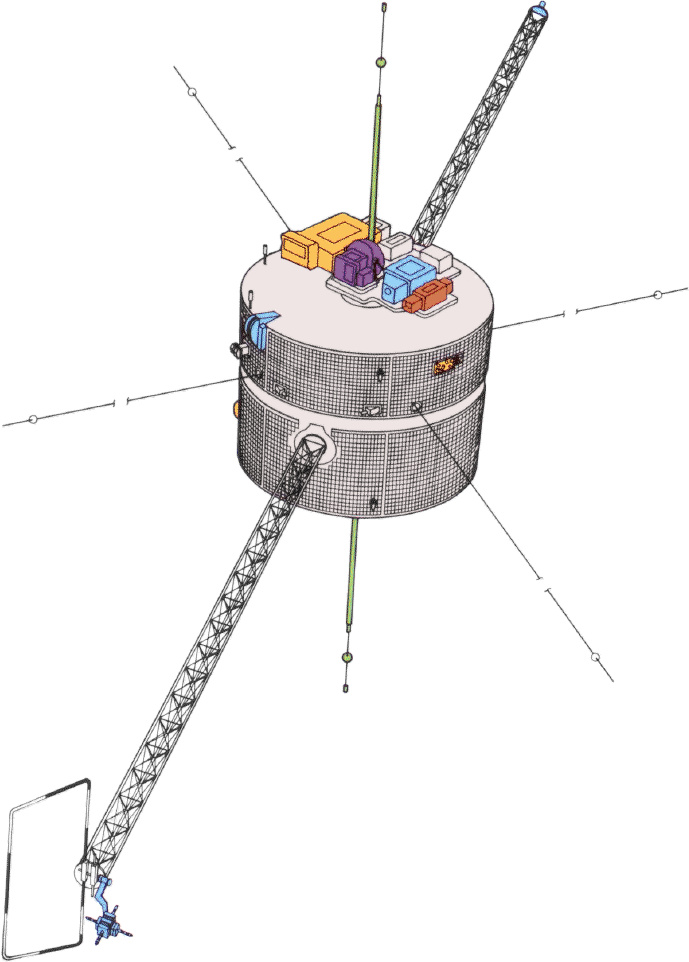
- Polar is the second of NASA's Global Geospace Science program
- Names: GGS/Polar, ISTP/Polar, Polar Plasma Laboratory
- Mission type: Earth observation
- Operator: NASA
- COSPAR ID: 1996-013A
- SATCAT no.: 23802
- Website: http://pwg.gsfc.nasa.gov/polar/
- Mission duration: Planned: 2 years Final: 12 years, 2 months, 3 days

Spacecraft properties
- Manufacturer: Lockheed Martin Astro Space
- Launch mass: 1,297 kg (2,859 lb)
- Dry mass: 1,028 kg (2,266 lb)
- Payload mass: 264 kg (582 lb)
- Dimensions: 2.4 × 1.8 m (7.9 × 5.9 ft)
- Power: 440 watts

Start of mission
- Launch date: February 24, 1996, 11:24 UTC
- Rocket: Delta II 7925-10 D233
- Launch site: Vandenberg SLC-2W

End of mission
- Disposal: Decommissioned
- Deactivated: April 28, 2008

Orbital parameters
- Reference system: Geocentric
- Regime: Highly elliptical
- Semi-major axis: 35,490.94 km (22,053.05 mi)
- Eccentricity: 0.701992
- Perigee altitude: 4,198.46 km (2,608.80 mi)
- Apogee altitude: 54,027.15 km (33,570.91 mi)
- Inclination: 78.63°
- Period: 1,109.02 minutes
- RAAN: 260.60°
- Argument of perigee: 306.12°
- Mean anomaly: 7.84°
- Mean motion: 1.30°
- Epoch: August 19, 2018, 04:42:45 UTC
- Revolution no.: 10,771
Instruments
- MFE: Magnetic Field Experiment
- EFI: Electric Fields Instrument
- PWI: Plasma Wave Instrument
- HYDRA: Hot Plasma Analyzer Experiment
- TIDE/PSI: Thermal Ion Dynamics Experiment/Plasma Source Investigation
- TIMAS: Toroidal Imaging Mass-Angle Spectrograph
- CAMMICE: Charge and Mass Magnetospheric Ion Composition Experiment
- CEPPAD: Comprehensive Energetic-Particle Pitch Angle Distribution
- UVI: Ultraviolet Imager
- VIS: Visible Imaging System
- PIXIE: Polar Ionospheric X-ray Imaging Experiment

The Global Geospace Science (GGS) Polar satellite was a NASA science spacecraft designed to study the polar magnetosphere and aurorae. It was launched into orbit in February 1996, and continued operations until the program was terminated in April 2008. The spacecraft remains in orbit, though it is now inactive. Polar is the sister ship to GGS Wind.

== Launch ==
It was designed and manufactured by Lockheed Martin, and launched at 11:23:59.997 UTC on February 24, 1996, aboard a McDonnell Douglas Delta II 7925-10 rocket from launch pad 2W at Vandenberg Air Force Base in Lompoc, California, to study the polar magnetosphere.

The spacecraft was placed into a highly elliptical orbit with apogee at 9 Earth radii and perigee at 1.8 Earth radii (geocentric), 86 degrees inclination, with a period of around 18 hours. The apogee was initially over the northern polar region, but has since been precessing south at about 16° per year.

== Operations ==
Sensors on the spacecraft gathered multi-wavelength imaging of the aurora, and measured the entry of plasma into the polar magnetosphere and the geomagnetic tail, the flow of plasma to and from the ionosphere, and the deposition of particle energy in the ionosphere and upper atmosphere.

The nominal mission duration was two years, but was extended several times. Polar Mission Operations were finally terminated on April 28, 2008, after the spacecraft depleted its remaining fuel.

== Characteristics ==
Polar is a cylindrical satellite of 2.4 meters in diameter and 1.8 meters in height built by the "Astro Space" division of Martin Marietta. WIND is a stabilized satellite rotation at a speed of 10 rpm about its axis which is maintained perpendicular to the plane of the ecliptic. A platform that serves as support for certain instruments (including imaging) require that their field of view is fixed is fixed to the top of the satellite and rotates in the opposite direction. Satellite walls are covered with solar cells that provide 440 watts of electricity including 186 W are used by the scientific instruments. The satellite has a mass of 1297 kg, including 269 kg of propellant and 264 kg payload. It is designed for a minimum lifetime of 2 years. Scientific data are stored on a digital recorder with a capacity of 1.3 gigabits and transmitted at a rate between 56 and 512 kb. Polar is the twin satellite of Wind.

== Scientific instruments ==
Polar carried 11 scientific instruments totaling a mass of 264 kg:

Five instruments studying the local electromagnetic fields at low frequency:

- MFE (Magnetic Field Experiment)
- EFI (Electric Fields Instrument)
- PWI (Plasma Wave Instrument)
- HYDRA (Hot Plasma Analyzer Experiment)
- TIDE/PSI (Thermal Ion Dynamics Experiment / Plasma Source Investigation)

Three instruments responsible for studying populations of particles associated with electromagnetic fields:

- TIMAS (Toroidal Imaging Mass Angle Spectrograph)
- CAMMICE (Charge and Mass Magnetospheric Ion Composition Experiment)
- CEPPAD (Comprehensive Energetic Particle-Pitch Angle Distribution)

Three imagers responsible for providing a comprehensive view of the processes that interact with the upper atmosphere:

- UVI (Ultraviolet Imager)
- VIS (Visible Imaging System)
- PIXIE (Polar Ionospheric X-ray Imaging Experiment)

== Results ==
Polar collected images of auroras in multiple wavelengths. It also measured the amount of plasma used in the polar regions of the magnetosphere, the flow of the latter in the ionosphere and the entry of other charged particles in it and in the upper atmosphere. For the first time the entire sequence of events initiated by magnetic substorms to the generation of the aurora was observed in detail. Analysis of the collected data determined that solar storms deposited such an amount of energy in the ionosphere that it stretched to fill the magnetosphere completely. Polar instruments were used during the primary mission of the THEMIS satellite between January and April for his study of magnetic tail.

A time-lapse animation of aurorae over both Earth poles shows symmetries and simultaneous changes - the long-suspected aurora mirroring – in images from the Visible Imaging System (VIS).

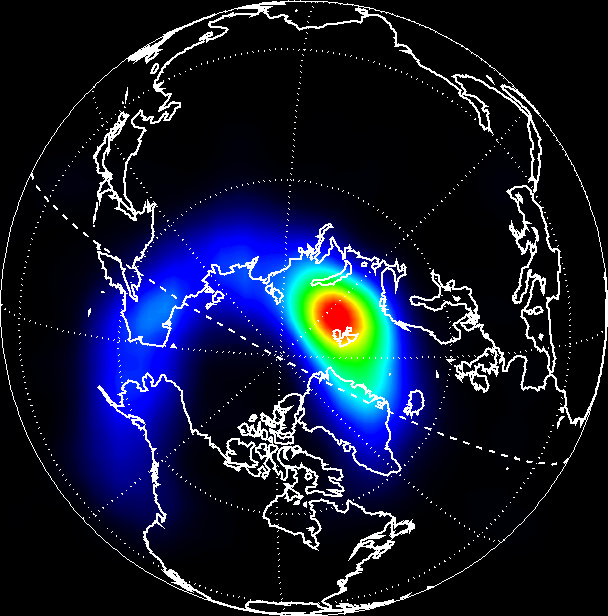
This composite image contains the first picture of the Earth in X-rays, taken in March 1996 by Polar.
