= Skip distance =

Distance a radio wave travels in propagation

A skip distance is the distance a radio wave travels, usually including a hop in the ionosphere. A skip distance is a distance on the Earth's surface between the two points where radio waves from a transmitter, refracted downwards by different layers of the ionosphere, fall. It also represents how far a radio wave has travelled per hop on the Earth's surface, for radio waves such as the short wave (SW) radio signals that employ continuous reflections for transmission.

== Propagation Path ==
Radio waves from a particular transmitting antenna do not all get refracted by a particular layer of the ionosphere; some are absorbed, some refracted while a portion escapes to the next layer. At this higher layer, there is a possibility of this radio wave being bent downwards to earth again. This bending happens because each layer of the ionosphere has a refractive index that varies from that of the others. Because of the differing heights of refraction, or apparent reflection, the radio waves hit the earth surface at different points hence generating the skip distance. Skip distance is greatest during the night when the ionosphere is the highest.

== See also ==
Maximum usable frequency
