= Critical frequency =

In telecommunications, the term critical frequency has the following meanings:

- In radio propagation by way of the ionosphere, the frequency at or below which a wave component is reflected by, and above which it penetrates through, an ionospheric layer.
- At near vertical incidence, the limiting frequency at or below which incidence, the wave component is reflected by, and above which it penetrates through, an ionospheric layer.

Critical Frequency changes with time of day, atmospheric conditions and angle of fire of the radio waves by antenna.

The existence of the critical frequency is the result of electron limitation, i.e., the inadequacy of the existing number of free electrons to support reflection at higher frequencies.

In signal processing the critical frequency it is also another name for the Nyquist frequency.

Critical frequency is the highest magnitude of frequency above which the waves penetrate the ionosphere and below which the waves are reflected back from the ionosphere. It is denoted by "f_{c}". Its value is not fixed and it depends upon the electron density of the ionosphere.

== Equations ==
=== Critical frequency as a function of electron density ===
Critical frequency can be computed with the electron density given by:

$f_\text{c} = 9\sqrt{N_\text{max}}$

where N_{max} is maximum electron density per m^{3} and f_{c} is in Hz.

=== Critical frequency as a function of maximum usable frequency ===
Critical frequency can be computed by:

$f_\text{c} = MUF*cos\theta$

where MUF is maximum usable frequency and $\theta$ is the angle of incidence

== Relationship with plasma frequency ==
The dependence of critical frequency with respect with electron density can be related through plasma oscillation concept particularly the 'Cold' Electrons mechanism.

$\omega_{\mathrm{pe}} = \sqrt{\frac{n_\mathrm{e} e^{2}}{m^*\varepsilon_0}}, \left[\mathrm{rad/s}\right]$

Using the electron charge $e=1.602\cdot 10^{-19} Coulombs$, electron mass $m^*=9.10938356\cdot 10^{-31} kilograms$ and permittivity of free space $\epsilon_o=8.854187817\cdot 10^{-12}A^2s^4m^{-3}kg^{-1}$gives,

$\omega_{\mathrm{pe}} = 2\pi f=56.415 \sqrt{n_e}$

and solving for the frequency,

$f_\text{c} = 8.979\sqrt{N_\text{max}} \approx 9\sqrt{N_\text{max}}$

== Relationship with index of refraction ==
The index of refraction has the formula $n=\frac{c}{v}$which shows dependence in wavelength. The result that the force due to the polarization field in an ionized gas of low concentration is canceled by the effect of collisions between ions and electrons is re‐established in a simple manner that clearly displays the physical basis for the effect. Because of this cancellation the Sellmeyer formula, determines the relation between the electron number density, N, and the index of refraction, n, in the ionosphere when collisions are neglected.

$n^2-1=\frac{-Ne^2}{\epsilon_o m \omega^2}$.

Using the default values for electron charge $e$, permittivity of free space and electron mass $\epsilon_o$, and changing angular velocity $\omega$with respect to frequency $f$this yields to

$n^2-1=\frac{3182.607N}{(2\pi f)^2}$

and solving for the refraction index n,

$n=\sqrt{1-\frac{80.616N}{f^2}} \approx \sqrt{1-\frac{81N}{f^2}}$

== Critical frequency and the F layer of the ionosphere ==
- All long-distance HF radio communications use HF radio signals that are obliquely incident on the ionosphere. If the HF frequency is above the critical frequency, the radio signals pass through the ionosphere at an angle instead of head-on.
- The critical frequency changes continuously and the F layer of the ionosphere is mostly responsible for the reflection of radio waves back to Earth.
- The other layers(D) interact in other ways - absorption of frequency and during the day, the D Layers forms, and the F layer splits into F1 and F2 layers.
- Because of changing the Ionosphere during day and night, during daytime higher frequency bands under critical Frequency work best, but during nighttime the lower frequency bands work best.
- The D layer is present during the day and it is a good absorber of radio waves, increasing losses, Higher frequencies are absorbed less, so higher frequencies tends to perform better during daytime.
- The actual F2-Layer Critical Frequency Map link which refreshes every five minutes can be seen in this website http://www.spacew.com/www/fof2.html
- The Ionosphere and the Practical Maximum Usable Frequencies (MUFs) Map link which refreshes every five minutes can be seen in this website http://www.sws.bom.gov.au/HF_Systems/6/9/1

== See also ==
- High Frequency
- High Frequency Active Auroral Research Program
- High Frequency Internet Protocol
- Low frequency
- Radio propagation
- Space weather
