= Lowest usable high frequency =

Radio transmission term

The lowest usable high frequency (LUF), in radio transmission, is a frequency in the HF band at which the received field intensity is sufficient to provide the required signal-to-noise ratio for a specified time period, e.g., 0100 to 0200 UTC, on 90% of the undisturbed days of the month. Any frequency lower than this is not able to fulfill those requirements, while higher frequencies usually yield better result until the maximum usable frequency is reached. The amount of energy absorbed by the lower regions of the ionosphere (D region, primarily) directly impacts the LUF.

== See also ==
- Maximum usable frequency
- Frequency of optimum transmission
- Federal Standard 1037C
