= Total electron content =

Descriptive quantity of the ionosphere

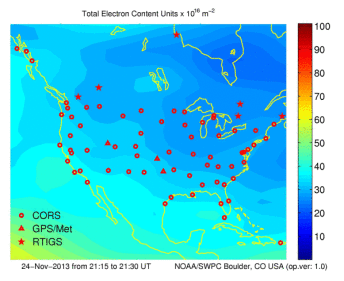
Contour plot of the TEC above the contiguous United States on 24 November 2013 from 21:15 to 21:30 UTC

Total electron content (TEC) is a descriptive quantity for the ionosphere of the Earth. TEC is the total number of electrons integrated between two points, along a tube of one meter squared cross section, i.e., the electron columnar number density. It is often reported in multiples of the TEC unit, or TECU, defined as 10^{16} electrons per m^{2}.

TEC is significant in determining the scintillation and group and phase delays of a radio wave through a medium. Ionospheric TEC is characterized by observing carrier phase delays of received radio signals transmitted from satellites located above the ionosphere, often using Global Navigation Satellite System (GNSS) satellites. TEC is strongly affected by solar activity.

== Formulation ==
The TEC is path-dependent. By definition, it can be calculated by integrating along the path ds through the ionosphere with the location-dependent electron density n_{e}(s):

$${\rm TEC} = \int n_e(s)\,ds$$

The vertical TEC (VTEC) is determined by integration of the electron density on a perpendicular to the ground standing route, the slant TEC (STEC) is obtained by integrating over any straight path.

== Propagation delay ==
To first order, the ionospheric radio propagation effect is proportional to TEC and inversely proportional to the radio frequency f. The ionospheric phase delay compared to propagation in vacuum reads:

$$\tau_p^\mathrm{iono} = -\kappa \frac{\mathrm{TEC}}{f^2}$$

while the ionospheric group delay has the same magnitude but opposite sign:

$$\tau_g^\mathrm{iono} = -\tau_p^\mathrm{iono}$$

The ionospheric delay is normally expressed in units of length (meters), assuming a delay duration (in seconds) multiplied by the vacuum speed of light (in m/s). The proportionality constant κ reads:

$$\kappa = \frac{1}{4\pi\epsilon_0} \frac{q^2}{2\pi m_e} = \frac{c^2 r_e}{2\pi}$$

where q, m_{e}, r_{e} are the electron charge, mass, and radius, respectively; c is the vacuum speed of light and ϵ_{0} is the vacuum permittivity. The value of the constant is approximately κ ≈ 40.308193 m^{3}·s^{−2}; the units can be expressed equivalently as m·m^{2}·Hz^{2} to highlight the cancellation involved in yielding delays τ in meters, given f in Hz and TEC in m^{−2}.

The second-order term produces GNSS positioning errors on the order of millimeters. For its computation, see Hernández‐Pajares et al. (2007).

== Typical values ==
Typical daytime values of TEC are expressed on the scale from 0 to 100 TEC units. However, very small variations of 0.1-0.5 TEC units can be also extracted under the assumption of relatively constant observational biases. These small TEC variations are related to medium-scale traveling ionospheric disturbances (MSTIDs). These ionospheric disturbances are primarily generated by gravity waves propagating upward from lower atmosphere.
