= Weibel Scientific =

Danish designer and manufacturer of doppler radars

WEIBEL SCIENTIFIC A/S
- Formerly: WEST EUROPEAN INTEGRATED BALLISTIC EQUIPMENT LIMITED A/S
- Type: Aktieselskab
- Industry: Electronics design; Software; Defense; Aviation; Space
- Founder: M. P. Weibel
- Headquarters: Solvang 30, DK-3450, Allerød, Denmark
- Key people: Peter Hergett Røpke (CEO); Jørgen Jensen (chairman); Thomas Øiseth Munkholm (Deputy Chairman)
- Owner: Tina Munkholm Larsen Møller; Thomas Øiseth Munkholm
- Number of employees: 600
- Parent: Weibel Scientific Holding A/S
- Subsidiaries: Weibel Equipment GmbH. Weibel Incorporated ApS Weibel Norway AS Weibel Equipment Inc.
- Website: https://weibelradars.com/

Weibel Scientific is a Danish engineering company that has specialised in the design and manufacture of doppler radar systems.

It has been in operation since 1936, originally being named M. P. Weibel and having worked as an electronics business throughout the firm's existence. Since the 1970s, the company has focused on becoming a specialised in the field of radar. Having developed an international presence over its decades of existence, Weibel Scientific’s products have been used by a diverse range of operators and for numerous purposes, including the tracking of space vehicles by NASA, as well as the detection of unmanned aerial vehicles and the guidance component of ground-based air defense systems for various nations' militaries.

== History ==
Weibel Scientific can trace its origins back to the establishment of Danish electronics company M. P. Weibel in 1936. It was originally named after its founder, Marius Peter Weibel, and has been a technology-oriented firm even in its early years. 1977 was a year of significant change for Weibel, as the Weibel family decided to divest the business; and the firm's general manager, Erik Tingleff Larsen, established the firm as Weibel Scientific during this same year.

During the late 1970s and 1980s, Weibel Scientific progressively wound down its previous primary business activity of manufacturing optical detectors, opting to focus its resources on the development of radar systems. In response to international demands for the company's product, management decided to expand the firm beyond Denmark's borders. Accordingly, in 1989, a new German subsidiary, Weibel GmbH, was established; during 1993, the US-based Weibel Equipment Inc. was founded to explore business opportunities in the North American market.

During 2002, Erik Tingleff Larsen stepped back from Weibel Scientific’s day-to-day management, Peder R. Pedersen having become the firm's CEO and President. Larsen has been the firm's sole shareholder, as well as the chairman of the board, for many years. In terms of its corporate structure, Weibel Scientific is organised as a privately owned, independently operated corporation.

For decades, the company has marketed its products for purposes such as missile defense systems, and has sold thousands of radar units in the United States alone. The American space organisation NASA has been a long term customer of Weibel, the firm's radar systems have been used to detect debris coming off the Space Shuttle during its launch phase.

During summer 2015, it was announced that Weibel Scientific has entered into a long-term partnership with American defence conglomerate Lockheed Martin. The stated aim of this partnership is to integrate Weibel’s radar technology with Lockheed Martin’s missile defense systems, and to act as a major supplier of missile defense packages throughout the North American and European markets. During December 2017, through this partnership, Weibel Scientific received its largest contract to date from the United States Army; this deal has Lockheed Martin acting as the prime contractor for the production and delivery of three Multi-Frequency Tracking Radars.

In January 2019, Weibel Scientific established an office in Norway to facilitate its strategic move towards the drone detection and ground-based air defense markets. During September 2019, the firm secured a contract to supply a phased-array tracking radar to the Andøya Space Center, Norway.

In November 2019, it was announced that Norwegian defense and technology company Kongsberg Gruppen had signed a major contract with Weibel Scientific to provide their radar systems for the Norwegian Army new mobile ground-based air defense system, which will use elements of Norwegian Advanced Surface to Air Missile System (NASAMS) technology; Pedersen stated that it was "one of the most strategically important contracts we have won in our entire history". The line of XENTA-M radars for short-range air defense was announced in November 2020.

Weibel Scientific’s headquarters is located in Allerød, Denmark. As of 2020 just over 170 people have been typically employed at the headquarters.

== Products ==
All of Weibel's radars operate in the X band and function as continuous wave doppler radars. The firm designs and produces several classes of radars, including:

- Muzzle velocity radars or Velocimeters for artillery and guns, STANAG 4114 compliant (MVRS-700 series). As of July 2025 operators in more than 20 countries.
- Fixed head Doppler radars (SL-xxxx series)
- Tracking radars (MSL-xxxx series)
- Ranging radars for Optical Platforms
- Multi-Frequency Long Range Tracking radars (MFTR-xxxx series)
- Short-range air defense (XENTA-M series)
