= High Frequency Internet Protocol =

Radio communication protocol

High Frequency Internet Protocol (HFIP or HF-IP) is usually associated with Automatic Link Establishment and HF radio data communications. HFIP provides protocol layers enabling internet file transfer, chat, web and email. HFIP commonly uses ionospheric propagation of radio waves to form a wide area network that can span thousands of kilometers. HF transceivers in HFIP service typically run 20 to 150 watts for portable or mobile units, up to approximately 2000 watts transmitter output for high power base stations with HFIP servers.

STANAG 5066 is a common HFIP standard.

An amateur radio HFIP network called HFLINK uses Automatic Link Establishment for initiating data communications, with ARQ 8FSK frequency-shift keying and PSK phase-shift keying signals.
