= Maximum usable frequency =

Highest radio frequency that can be used for skywave radio transmission

In radio transmission, maximum usable frequency (MUF) is the highest radio frequency that can be used for transmission between two points on Earth by reflection from the ionosphere (skywave or skip) at a specified time, independent of transmitter power. This index is especially useful for shortwave transmissions.

In shortwave radio communication, a major mode of long distance propagation is for the radio waves to reflect off the ionized layers of the atmosphere and return diagonally back to Earth. In this way radio waves can travel beyond the horizon, around the curve of the Earth. However the refractive index of the ionosphere decreases with increasing frequency, so there is an upper limit to the frequency which can be used. Above this frequency the radio waves are not reflected by the ionosphere but are transmitted through it into space.

The ionization of the atmosphere varies with time of day and season as well as with solar conditions, so the upper frequency limit for skywave communication varies throughout the day. MUF is a median frequency, defined as the highest frequency at which skywave communication is possible 50% of the days in a month, as opposed to the lowest usable high frequency (LUF) which is the frequency at which communication is possible 90% of the days, and the frequency of optimum transmission (FOT).

Typically the MUF is a predicted number. Given the maximum observed frequency (MOF) for a mode on each day of the month at a given hour, the MUF is the highest frequency for which an ionospheric communications path is predicted on 50% of the days of the month.

On a given day, communications may or may not succeed at the MUF. Commonly, the optimal operating frequency for a given path is estimated at 80 to 90% of the MUF. As a rule of thumb the MUF is approximately 3 times the critical frequency.

$\text{MUF} = \frac{\text{critical frequency}}{\cos\theta}$

where the critical frequency is the highest frequency reflected for a signal propagating directly upward and θ is the angle of incidence.

== Optimum Working Frequency ==
Another important parameter used in skywave propagation is the optimum working frequency (OWF), which estimates the maximum frequency that must be used for a given critical frequency and incident angle. It is the frequency chosen to avoid the irregularities of the atmosphere.

$\mathrm{OWF} = 0.85 \mathrm{MUF} = 0.85 f_\mathrm{c} /(cos\theta)$

== See also ==
- DX communication
- E-layer
- E-skip
- F-layer
- Lowest usable high frequency
- MW DX
- Near vertical incidence skywave
- Radio propagation
- Skip distance
- TV-FM DX

== Sources ==
This article incorporates public domain material from Federal Standard 1037C. General Services Administration. Archived from the original on 2022-01-22. (in support of MIL-STD-188).
