= Coastal ocean dynamics applications radar =

Scientific radar

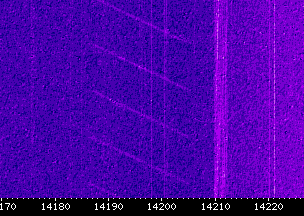
A CODAR source, detected in Atlanta, Georgia, on 14195 kHz, as seen from a software-defined radio's waterfall display. The sweeping, diagonal line is the CODAR signal.

Recording of CODAR transmissions on 4.630mhz

Coastal ocean dynamics applications radar (CODAR) is a type of portable, land-based, high frequency (HF) radar developed between 1973 and 1983 at NOAA's Wave Propagation Laboratory in Boulder, Colorado. CODAR is a noninvasive system that can measure and map near-surface ocean currents in coastal waters. It is transportable and can produce ocean current maps on site in near real time. Moreover, using CODAR it is possible to measure wave heights and produce an indirect estimate of local wind direction.

== Equipment ==
CODAR utilizes a compact antenna system that consists of crossed loops and a whip for receiving and a whip for transmitting radio pulses. The system can be transported by vehicle and can operate from a portable power supply; for modern instrumentation a minimum capacity of 1050 Watts is recommended. CODAR is capable of operating in virtually all weather conditions (it can tolerate temperatures from 0 °F (-18 °C) to 90 °F (32 °C)) and the relatively small dimensions of the antenna system allow CODAR deployment even in highly populated and rocky coastal areas. However, as the signal is rapidly attenuated by land, the antenna has to be mounted as close to the water surface as possible.

Modern equipment can operate from 3 to 50 MHz and can be programmed for unattended operation for periods of up to two weeks.

The main equipment is cabled to the electronic segment, that is housed nearby in a sheltered environment and contains the system hardware, where information is stored. A minicomputer controls the radar and processes the signals and the operator can communicate with the system through a portable keyboard terminal.

The raw spectral data can be processed on-line to obtain real-time outputs and the final data products can be displayed on a graphics terminal or printed with a hardcopy plotter. Off-line processing at a later date can be accomplished as well.

== Applications ==
The main purpose of CODAR is to measure surface current. The systems' range and resolution vary with environmental conditions and antenna placement. In general, however, in their long-range mode, modern CODAR can measure out to 100–200 km offshore with a resolution of 3–12 km. By increasing the frequency, resolutions as fine as 200–500 m can be obtained, but the observation range is shortened to 15–20 km.

However, the actual range can be limited by radio interference, high-ocean states and ground conditions in the vicinity of the antennas. Wet and moist sandy soils enhance ground wave propagation, whereas dry and rocky grounds attenuate the signal.

A single CODAR system can measure only the component of surface current travelling toward or away from the radar, so to determine the total surface current vectors, it is necessary to use at least a two-system setup. An array of CODAR sites can be employed to obtain regional coverage. In a multiple radar configuration, spacing between two radar systems should be approximately 15 to 40 km for long-range open ocean mode and 8 to 20 km in short-range mode.

Typically, CODAR data are averaged over one hour to reduce the noisiness of the sea echo. Therefore, current maps can be produced every hour. This period can be reduced to approximately 20 minutes, however data collected over short periods may be noisy.

CODAR's measurements are useful for both military and civil purposes. Main applications include coastal engineering and public safety projects, planning of navigational seaways, mitigation of ocean pollution, search and rescue operations, oil-spill mitigation in real time and larval population connectivity assessment. Also, data obtained from CODAR are used as inputs for global resource monitoring and weather forecasting models and are particularly helpful for tidal and storm-surge measurements. Moreover, the direction of propagation of wave energy and the period of the most energetic waves, can be extracted from the measurements, which are important for many practical applications in design and operation of coastal and offshore structures.

== Theory of operation ==
CODAR operates using sky transmission of waves in the high frequency (HF) band (3–30 MHz), as electromagnetic waves in this band have wavelengths commensurate with wind-driven gravity waves on the ocean surface. As the customer needs, it can be used in single or multi-frequency mode. As the ocean has a rough surface, when a high frequency signal reaches the ocean surface, a portion of the incident energy is scattered back towards the source and the receiver measures the reflected signal. This backscattering (or reflection) produces an energy spectrum at the receiver, even if the energy source is single-frequency, because of the shape and motion of the sea surface. Interpreting the spectral returns for various transmit frequencies is the key to extracting information about the ocean and, specifically, to measure surface currents.

As a consequence of Bragg’s Scattering Law, the strongest received return comes from ocean waves traveling directly toward or away from the radar source and whose physical wavelength is exactly one-half as long as the transmitted radar wave. The return signal is processed and its spectral analysis provides the sea-echo Doppler spectrum, where two dominant peaks at different frequencies can be recognized.

Displacement of these peaks away from their known frequencies is called the “echo Doppler shift” and allows one to assess the radial velocity of a surface current. That is; the scatter velocity along the line between the hit surface and the radar. In fact, the magnitude of this component of the velocity is proportional to the degree of signal-shift. Therefore, CODAR measures the Doppler-induced frequency-shift (along with the distance from the radar to the sector and directional angle) to provide an estimate of the radial-component of wave-speed in the sector of sea surface of interest.

== Measuring surface currents ==
In order to measure currents, the CODAR equipment computes three components:

- the velocity of incoming waves in the radial direction
- the distance from the radar equipment to the evaluated ocean sector
- the angle the waves are traveling relatively to the CODAR station

=== Computation of the radial velocity of currents ===
The signal sent from the CODAR antenna has a known frequency and it moves at the speed of light. Therefore, the wavelength of the signal is known (wavelength = speed of light / frequency). Exploiting Bragg’s Law, CODAR maximizes the scattered HF signal, given that the resonance will only occur for the given wavelength:

λ_{s} = λ_{t} / (2 * cos(φ) )

where λ_{s} is the wavelength of surface ocean wave, λ_{t} is the wavelength of transmitted signal and φ is the angle of incidence between the signal and the ocean surface

As the CODAR antennas are usually placed at sea level, the angle of incidence theta can be assumed to be zero. Therefore, the equation reduces to:

λ_{s} = λ_{t} / 2

This means that when the emitted signal hits waves with wavelength equal to one-half of the transmitted signal, the signal that is scattered back to the antenna will be in phase. Therefore, these waves will produce a scattered signal “stronger” and thus easily identifiable, which is measured by the CODAR system. Thus, the current speed is extracted by determining the Doppler Shift of the waves.

However, the above equations represent a simplified model, as they assume that the reflecting waves are not moving. This is of course untrue and, because of the motion, the frequency of the scattered signal (and therefore its wavelength) is not the same as that of the transmitted signal. In fact, “waves moving toward the receiver increase the return frequency, while waves moving away decrease the return frequency”.

Then a further Doppler shift (Δf ) is observed and, by measuring it, it is possible to determine the radial velocity ν_{s} component of the surface current by using the Doppler formula:

Δf = ν_{s} / λ_{s}

=== Computation of the distance to target ===
The range to target is calculated starting from the time delay, which is obtained by subtracting the return signal time from the transmitted signal one.

=== Computation of the angular direction to target ===
CODAR is a "direction finding system". The signal is received by two loop antennas and a monopole. Whereas the signal the monopole receives does not vary with the direction of the incoming signal, the signal received by the two loop antennas (positioned at a 90° angle) does vary with direction. This information permits a software to determine the direction of the signal.

Once calculated the radial velocity of currents, distance to target, and the angular direction to target it is possible to determine the current vector and to construct current vector maps. In fact, for the area in which vector data from two CODAR sites overlap, it is possible to calculate the velocity and direction of the current and comparisons with surface drifters and error analysis made in 1979 indicate that CODAR measures surface currents with at least 10 cm/s accuracy. In 2010, retailers of modern CODAR equipments guarantee an accuracy typically < 7 cm/s of the total current velocity and 1–2 cm of the tidal component, in normal environment condition. However, the accuracy of the system depends on several factors, such as signal-to-noise ratios, geometry and pointing errors.

== Limitations ==
There are some limitations inherent to the system that do not permit certain applications. Here are presented the main practical limitations:

- CODAR cannot measure currents and waves less than 2 km from its location. This uncovered area results from the fact that the receiver is turned off during the pulse transmission. In this lapse of time, any signal backscattered is lost.
- CODAR’s resolution cell size is generally bigger than 5 km^{2}. This does not permit the use of this system for most inlets and harbor entrances.

As discussed before, for a given look angle, a single CODAR station can detect only the component of flow traveling toward or away from its location. Radial currents from two or more sites should be combined to obtain vector surface current estimates. Moreover, when using two CODAR stations the so-called "baseline problem" can affect the measurement. This occurs when both the instruments measure the same component of velocity. To avoid this problem and resolve properly the current vector, generally two radials must have an angle between 30° and 150°.

== See also ==
- Wave radar
