= Telecommunications for Disaster Relief =

Telecommunications for Disaster Relief (TDR) is a proposal by the International Telecommunication Union to establish worldwide standards of interoperability and availability of emergency communications. The notion of establishing such standards was spurred in part by the 2004 Indian Ocean earthquake and tsunami which devastated Indonesia.

The ITU assigned telephone country code is +888 for TDR, administered by the United Nations Office for the Coordination of Humanitarian Affairs. Numbers were assigned for the duration of a particular relief activity only, and could be reused for a future event. However, country code +888 was withdrawn from service and is now officially marked as “returned to spare.”
