= Global Geospace Science =

Global Geospace science program (GGS) is designed to improve greatly the understanding the flow of energy, mass and momentum in the solar-terrestrial environment with particular emphasis on geospace. GGS has primary scientific objective of its own:

a) Measure the mass, momentum and energy flow and their time variability throughout the solar wind-magnetosphere- ionosphere system that comprises the geospace environment;

b) Improve the understanding of plasma processes that control the collective behavior of various components of geospace and trace their cause and effect relationships through the system;

c) Access the importance to the terrestrial environment of variations in energy input to the atmosphere caused by geospace plasma processes.

Early space probes like the Explorer and IMP series of satellites and more recently ISEE (International Sun Earth Explorers), Dynamics Explorer and AMPTE (Active Magnetospheric Particle Tracer Explorer) carried out localized studies of these regions but without the global emphasis of GGS. Geospace is defined as the near-Earth space environment and it encompasses the regions toward the Sun where the heliosphere is disturbed by the Earth's magnetic field.

The Global Geospace Science Program is the US contribution to the ISTP Science Initiative. It was designed to address the goal of detailed understanding of the global features of the geospace system by integrating a number of key elements in its planning. First, the acquisition of coordinated and concurrent data from spacecraft placed in key orbits that allow the synergistically selected onboard instruments to sample simultaneously the principal regions of geospace where energy and momentum are transported and stored. These key regions are the upstream interplanetary medium (WIND), the geomagnetic tail (GEOTAIL, provided by Japan), the polar regions (POLAR) and the equatorial magnetosphere (equatorial science, originally covered by the EQUATOR spacecraft).

== Satellites ==
=== Wind ===
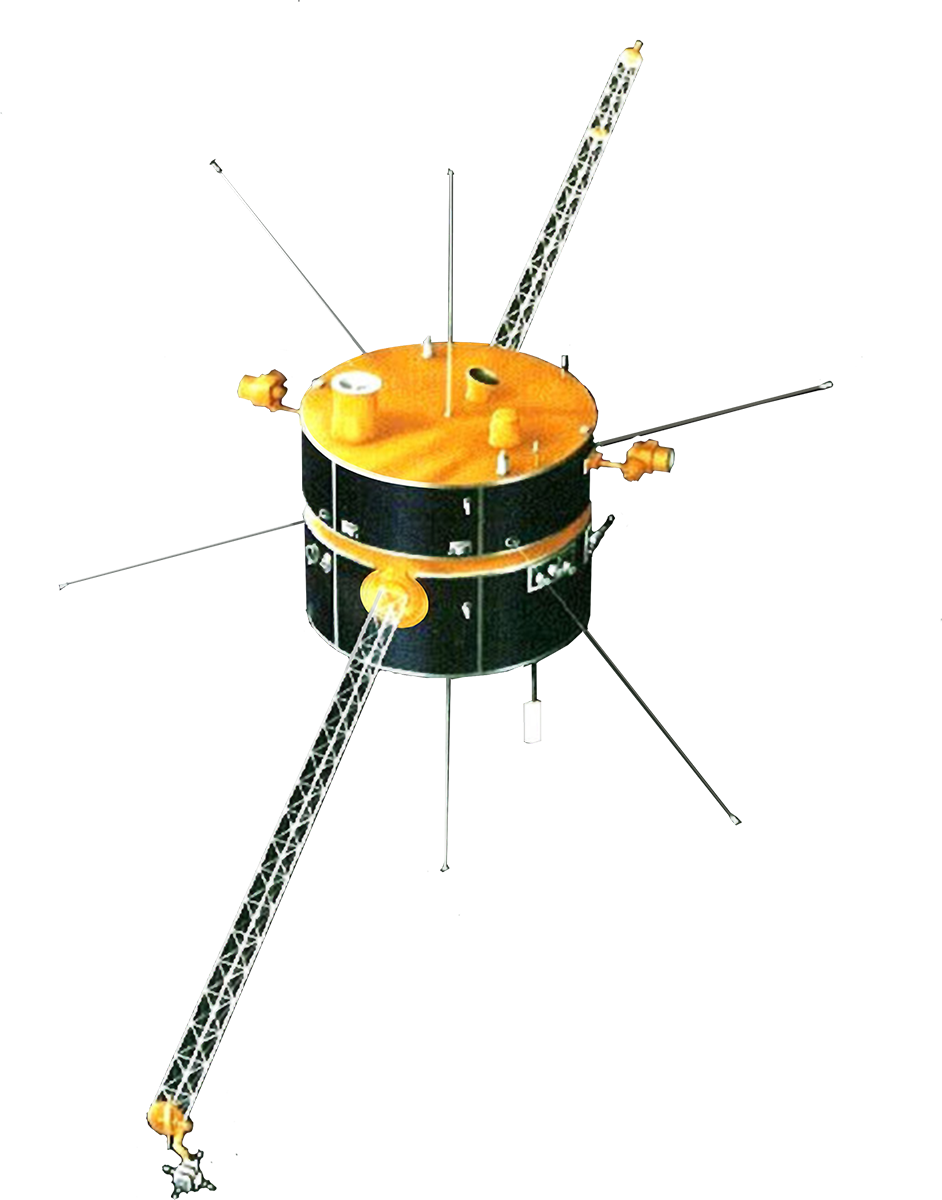

Wind is a spin stabilized spacecraft launched with a Delta II rocket on November 1, 1994. After several orbits through the magnetosphere, Wind was placed in a Lissajous orbit around the L1 Lagrange point -- more than 200 Re upstream of Earth -- in early 2004 to observe the unperturbed solar wind that is about to impact the magnetosphere of Earth. Wind was later inserted into a halo orbit about L1 in 2020.

=== Polar ===
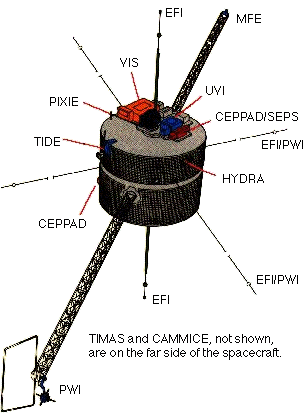

The Polar satellite, launched on February 24, 1996, is in a highly elliptical, 86 deg inclination orbit with a period of about 17.5 hours. Within the Sun-Earth Connections fleet, Polar has the responsibility for multi-wavelength imaging of the aurora, measuring the entry of plasma into the polar magnetosphere and the geomagnetic tail, the flow of plasma to and from the ionosphere, and the deposition of particle energy in the ionosphere and upper atmosphere. Polar was launched to observe the polar magnetosphere and, as its orbit has precessed with time, has observed the equatorial inner magnetosphere and is now progressing toward an extended southern hemisphere campaign.
