= AOR =

AOR may refer to:

== Entertainment ==
- Adult-oriented rock (disambiguation)
- Arena rock, a style of commercially oriented rock music
- Album-oriented rock, an American FM radio format
- AOR – Spirit of The Alarm, band
- Arab on Radar, an American noise rock band
- AOR (performance), a 1971 performance by Jean-Michel Jarre at the Paris Opera
- Alexander "Aor" Osipov, a member of the symphonic metal band Imperial Age

== Companies and organizations ==
- Advocates for Opioid Recovery
- Aliquippa & Ohio River Railroad, in Aliquippa, Pennsylvania, United States
- AOR (company) (Authority on Radio Communications, Ltd.), a Japanese manufacturer of radio equipment
- Auckland One Rail, in Auckland, New Zealand

== Other uses ==
- Agent of record, an insurance term
- Architect of Record, the architecture firm that prepares the construction documents for a new building project
- Agency of record, an advertising term
- Aor, a pen name of R. A. Schwaller de Lubicz (1887–1961)
- A US Navy hull classification symbol: Fleet replenishment oiler (AOR)
- AOR, the IATA airport code for Sultan Abdul Halim Airport, Malaysia
- Aorist, a grammatical aspect of some Indo-European languages, abbreviated "aor."
- App-o-rama, a strategy of completing multiple financial account applications in a short period of time
- Area of responsibility, a United States military acronym referring to the geographic region assigned to a strategic military command
- Atlantic Ocean Region, a part of the Tracking and Data Relay Satellite System
- Sperata aor, a catfish of family Bagridae
- Aur Island in Malaysia, also spelled "Aor"
- Adjusted Odds Ratio, an odds ratio that controls for multiple predictor variables in a statistical model
