= Praying Mantis (band) =

British rock band

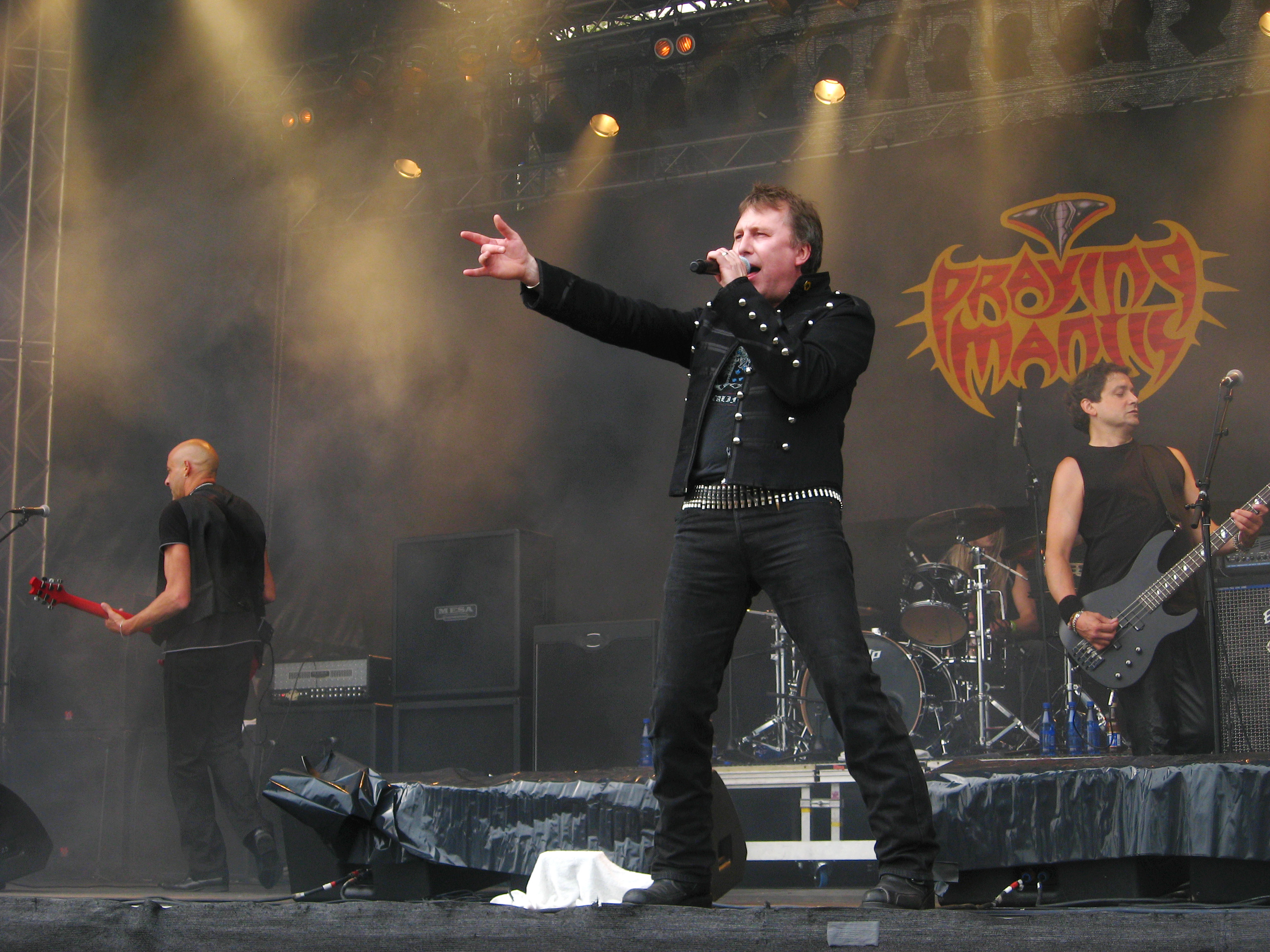
- Praying Mantis at Sweden Rock Festival 2010

Background information
- Origin: London, England
- Genres: Melodic hard rock; AOR; heavy metal (NWOBHM)
- Years active: 1973–1982, 1990–present
- Labels: Arista; Pony Canyon; Frontiers
- Members: Chris Troy; Tino Troy; Andy Burgess; Hans in't Zandt; John Cuijpers
- Past members: Bob Sawyer; Steve Carroll; Paul Di'Anno; Doogie White; Colin Peel; Gary Barden; Tony O'Hora; Mike Freeland; Jon Bavin; Dennis Stratton; Dave Potts; Bruce Bisland; Clive Burr; Benji Reid
- Website: prayingmantis.rocks

Praying Mantis are an English rock band. Originally part of the new wave of British heavy metal, they pursued a musical direction more AOR/melodic rock-sounding than their contemporaries Iron Maiden and Saxon.

== Career ==
=== 1973–1981: Formation and early years ===
Their formation considerably pre-dated the NWOBHM movement. They were formed in 1973 while at college by the Troy brothers, Tino and Chris, Pete Moore, and Chris Hudson. The band's genesis can be traced back to the influence of Neal Kay, a DJ at North London's premier hard rock disco, The Bandwagon. Thanks to Kay's support, Praying Mantis gained a platform to showcase their music, featuring tracks like "Captured City" and "Lovers to the Grave". Alongside contemporaries such as Iron Maiden, Angel Witch, and Samson, Praying Mantis quickly rose to prominence in the London music scene. 1980 saw their profile considerably raised with support slots for Iron Maiden and Ronnie Montrose's Gamma, and "Captured City" was included on the Metal for Muthas compilation. The attention won them a recording contract with Arista Records and they released their debut album Time Tells No Lies in 1981. Management instability undermined their success and Arista decided that they did not wish to take up the option of a further album. The following year, Praying Mantis signed for Jet Records, but two subsequent singles did not quite hit the mark and the band folded. During the making of Time Tells No Lies, Praying Mantis recorded a version of the Russ Ballard penned track "I Surrender", but ran into conflict with Rainbow, who went on to release their own version, and had a top 10 worldwide hit. Instead, Praying Mantis released "Cheated" which reached number 69 in the UK Singles Chart in January 1981.

=== 1982–1989: Hiatus ===
While Praying Mantis was on hiatus, the Troy brothers focused on other projects. Stratus (originally "Clive Burr's Escape", then briefly known as "Tygon" and "Stratas"), was a short-lived melodic hard rock/AOR supergroup. It was formed by ex-Iron Maiden drummer Clive Burr, the Troy brothers, plus ex-Grand Prix vocalist Bernie Shaw and keyboardist Alan Nelson. The band split after only one album, Throwing Shapes, released in 1985. Bernie Shaw became the lead vocalist for Uriah Heep the following year.

=== 1990–1996 Reunion and line-ups including Di'Anno, Stratton and Burr ===
The band maintained a strong fan base in Japan, and when the Troys temporarily reformed Praying Mantis for a NWOBHM nostalgia tour in 1990, they were encouraged by the response to resurrect the band full-time. A live album with former Iron Maiden members Dennis Stratton and Paul Di'Anno, on guitar and vocals respectively, was released as Live at Last, and a follow-up studio album Predator in Disguise was released the following year. In 1995, the band recruited ex-Michael Schenker Group vocalist Gary Barden and released the To the Power of Ten album in Japan during August. As drummer Bruce Bisland suffered a broken arm, he had his position filled by former Iron Maiden drummer Clive Burr.

=== 1997–2006: Final years with Dennis Stratton ===
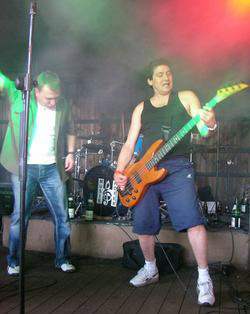
Praying Mantis at Headbanger's Open Air 2006

Praying Mantis, with Dennis Stratton as part of their line-up, continued to evolve musically, adapting to the changing rock music landscape. This period saw the band exploring new musical avenues while maintaining their core melodic hard rock identity. Since 1990, Dennis, Chris, and Tino were the nucleus of the band who wrote all the material. Stratton officially left Praying Mantis in 2006, although his final recorded material with them was in 2003.

=== 2007–2012: Sanctuary and Metalmorphosis 30th Anniversary EP ===
Andy Burgess officially joined Praying Mantis in 2007, taking on the role of guitarist. One of Burgess's most notable contributions to Praying Mantis was his role in the band's renowned dual guitar harmonies. These harmonies had long been a signature element of Praying Mantis' sound, and Burgess embraced this tradition while infusing it with his unique touch. In 2011, the Metalmorphosis 30th Anniversary EP was released. It includes 10 re-recorded classic Praying Mantis tracks by the 2011 band line-up.

=== 2013–2014: Hans in't Zandt and John Cuijpers join the band ===
In 2013, the band announced they are to release a new single in October that year. The single is to officially introduce new members, John Cuijpers (vocals) and Hans in't Zandt (drums), to the band's fanbase after playing Colchester, Ipswich (with support from MGR Records band Kaine) and Cambridge Rock Festival with the brand new line-up. In't Zandt had previously toured with notable acts such as Toto, Jeff Scott Soto, Mad Max, Sinner, and Vengeance. Cuijpers was associated with several notable bands and musical projects; his prominent prior affiliation was with the Dutch rock band Vandenberg's MoonKings.

=== 2015–present: Legacy, Gravity and Katharsis ===
Released in 2015, Legacy marked a formalisation of the band's new line-up, featuring John Cuijpers on vocals and Hans In't Zandt on drums, alongside long-standing members Andy Burgess, Tino Troy, and Chris Troy. The same line-up would go on and record Gravity (2018), Katharsis (2022) and Defiance (2024).

== Band members ==
Current members

- Tino Troy – guitar, keyboards, backing and lead vocals (1973–1982, 1990-present)
- Chris Troy – bass, backing and lead vocals (1973–1982, 1990-present)
- Andy Burgess – guitar, backing vocals (2007–present)
- John Cuijpers – lead vocals (2013–present)
- Hans in't Zandt – drums, percussion (2013–present)

Former members

- Bob Sawyer – guitar (1979–1980)
- Steve Carroll – lead vocals, guitar (1980–1982)
- Paul Di'Anno – lead vocals (1990)
- Doogie White – lead vocals (1992)
- Colin Peel – lead vocals (1993, 2002)
- Gary Barden - lead vocals (1995–1997)
- Tony O'Hora – lead vocals (1997–2002)
- Mike Freeland – lead vocals (2007–2012)
- Jon Bavin – keyboards (1982)
- Dennis Stratton – guitar, keyboards, lead and backing vocals (1990–2006)
- Dave Potts – drums, percussion (1979–1982)
- Bruce Bisland – drums, percussion, backing vocals (1990–2002)
- Clive Burr – drums, percussion (1995; substitute for Bruce Bisland)
- Benji Reid – drums, percussion (2007–2012)

== Discography ==
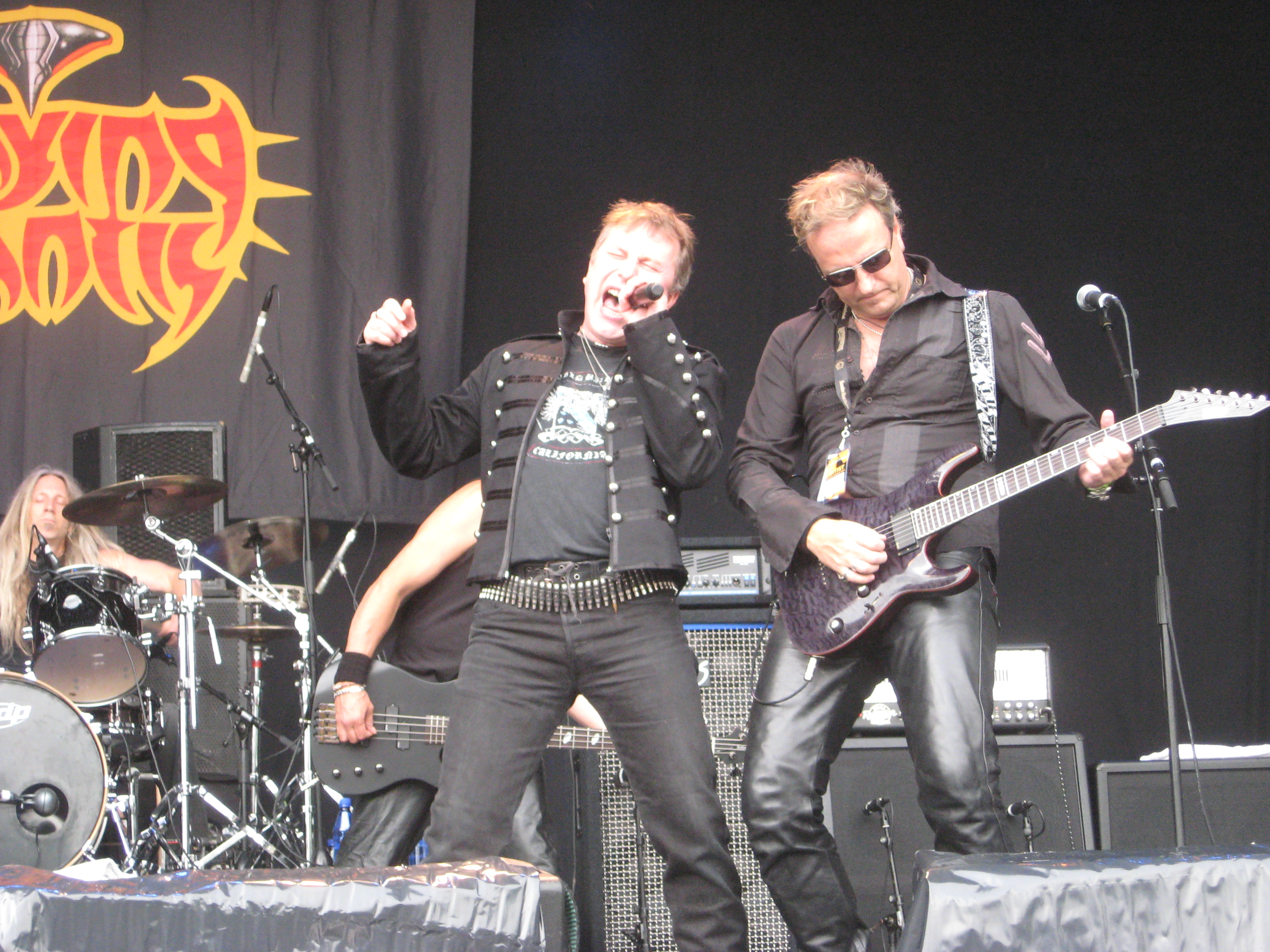
Praying Mantis at Sweden Rock Festival 2010

Studio albums

- Time Tells No Lies (1981)
- Predator in Disguise (1991)
- A Cry for the New World (1993)
- To the Power of Ten (1995)
- Forever in Time (1998)
- Nowhere to Hide (2000)
- The Journey Goes On (2003)
- Sanctuary (2009)
- Legacy (2015)
- Gravity (2018)
- Katharsis (2022)
- Defiance (2024)

Live albums

- Live at Last (1990)
- Captured Alive in Tokyo City (1996)
- Keep It Alive! (2019)

Compilations

- Demorabilia (1999)
- The Best of Praying Mantis (2004)
- Metalmorphosis – 30th Anniversary EP (2011)

== See also ==
- List of new wave of British heavy metal bands
