= Cheated (disambiguation) =

Cheated means to subvert the rules in order to obtain an unfair advantage.

Cheated may also refer to:

== Books ==
- Cheated, a novel by Patrick Jones, 2008
- The Cheated, a non-fiction book by Louis Nowra, 1979

== Songs ==
- "Cheated", a song by The Beat from Wha'ppen?, 1981
- "Cheated", a song by Boys Like Girls from Crazy World, 2012
- "Cheated", a song by Lamb of God from Resolution, 2012
- "Cheated", a song by Mike Posner from 31 Minutes to Takeoff, 2010
- "Cheated", a song by Praying Mantis from Time Tells No Lies, 1981
- "Cheated", a song by The Slackers from The Great Rocksteady Swindle, 2010
- "Cheated (To All the Girls)", a song by Wyclef Jean, 1998
