= MW DX =

Type of mediumwave radio reception

MW DX, short for mediumwave DXing, is the hobby of receiving distant mediumwave (also known as AM) radio stations. MW DX is similar to TV and FM DX in that broadcast band (BCB) stations are the reception targets. However, the nature of the lower frequencies (530 – 1710 kHz) used by mediumwave radio stations is very much different from that of the VHF and UHF bands used by FM and TV broadcast stations, and therefore involves different receiving equipment, radio propagation, and reception techniques.

== Propagation ==
During the daytime, medium and high-powered mediumwave AM radio stations have a normal reception range of about 20 to 250 miles (32 to 400+ km), depending on the transmitter power, location, and the quality of the receiving equipment, including the amount of man-made and natural electromagnetic noise present. Long-distance reception is normally impeded by the D layer of the ionosphere, which during the daylight hours absorbs signals in the mediumwave range.

As the sun sets, the D layer weakens, allowing medium wave radio waves from such stations to bounce off the F layer of the ionosphere, producing reliable, long distance reception of (especially) high-powered stations up to about 1,200 miles (2,000 km) away on a nightly basis. Aside from the more or less regular reception of certain high-powered transmitters, variable conditions allow reception of different stations at different times - for example, on one night a medium-powered broadcaster from Cleveland, Ohio may be audible in Duluth, Minnesota, but not on the following night. Much of the hobby consists in trying to receive and log as many of these stations as possible, identifying target stations and frequencies to listen to and log, along with sunrise and sunset ("SRS" and "SSS") periods when DX stations appear on and disappear from the dial.

Near or on the coastlines, trans-oceanic reception is quite common and a favored target of DXers in those areas. Very distant inter-continental DX from stations several thousands of miles away is possible even far inland, but may require exceptionally good conditions and a good receiver and antenna on the listening side.

== MW DX in North America ==
In the United States and Canada, stations on the mediumwave dial are spaced at 10 kHz intervals from 520 to 1710 kHz as prescribed since 1941 by the North American Regional Broadcasting Agreement. The tremendous number of radio stations in this region of the world and limited number of available frequencies means congestion is very common, and DXers may hear two, three, or more stations on the same frequency (especially on Class C "graveyard" frequencies where many lower-powered stations operate). The most powerful stations in the two countries are clear-channel stations which can transmit with 50 kilowatts of power. Examples of stations in this category from the List of clear-channel stations are: WLS in Chicago on 890 kHz, KMOX in St. Louis on 1120 kHz, WSB in Atlanta on 750 kHz, WCCO in Minneapolis on 830 kHz, WWL in New Orleans on 870 kHz, CJBC from Toronto on 860 kHz, WABC in New York City on 770 kHz, WLW in Cincinnati on 700 kHz, WHSQ, 880 kHz in New York City, and WTAM in Cleveland on 1100 kHz, all of which can be heard over much of the United States and Canada east of the Rocky Mountains. In the southern half of the United States, several Mexican stations can be heard. Many of these are called Border blaster stations because they program in English to reach the American market. Some of these operate with over 100 kW of power with highly directional antennae aimed northward to avoid interfering in the rest of Mexico. Many can be heard on a similar night-to-night basis. Many of these stations are also treaty allocated clear-channel stations, ensuring that there will be no interference or limited interference on the same frequency.

Although some distant listeners may rely on such stations for non-DX purposes, such as to hear a certain talk show or sporting event, DX'ers generally log these stations when they begin the hobby and afterwards pay little attention to them while seeking out new, less powerful and well-heard stations, often with a few kilowatts of power or less, or unusually distant stations. Especially prized in the former category are receptions of distant traveler information service (TIS) stations, operated by the Department of Transportation to give visitors information. These stations typically run at very low powers (limited to 10 watts) and are only intended to cover small areas, but may travel thousands of miles under certain instances. Similar are the tiny radio stations operated by high schools.

On the East Coast of the United States, it is not unusual for DX'ers to hear the high-powered European stations, which operate at 9 kHz intervals, rather than the 10 kHz in the United States, helping to reduce co-channel interference from domestic stations, from countries such as Spain and Norway. Stations from Africa and the Middle East are also often heard. The Pacific Coast of the US provides a similar opportunity with stations from Asian countries and Australia / New Zealand although a considerably longer distance must be covered. On both coasts, as well as in the middle portion of the country, "Pan-American" DX from Latin American and Caribbean nations is often sought and logged.

The AM expanded band, or "X-Band" as MW DXers often call it (not to be confused with the range of microwave frequencies), runs from 1610 kHz to 1700 kHz. This is a relatively new portion of the mediumwave broadcast spectrum, with the first two applications for frequencies having been granted in 1997. The lower density of stations in this area of the spectrum, as well as a lack of stations with more than 10 kW of power in the United States, has led to many DX'ers taking interest here.

== MW DX in Europe ==
Stations in Europe often run higher power than American stations, sometimes several hundreds of kilowatts. Synchronous networks are also commonly used, with local transmitter stations often having less of a local identity than those in the United States and Canada. The wide variety of languages spoken over the DX'ing range, from Spanish to Arabic, adds an element of challenge to DXing in the region. Some stations in Europe have taken to Digital Radio Mondiale transmissions, requiring a receiver capable of demodulating such signals, or a computer loaded with special software coupled to the receiver.

DX reception of North American stations occurs regularly during the early morning, especially during the solar minimum. CJYQ 930 kHz and VOCM 590 kHz (both from St. John's, Newfoundland and Labrador) are generally the easiest to receive, and their presence is taken as an indication that the reception of more distant stations is possible. North American stations whose frequencies are furthest from the 9 kHz multiples used in Europe are easier to receive, particularly since 24-hour broadcasting is normal in Europe.

== MW DX in Asia ==
In the southern half of the China, Japan, Korea (both south and north) and Taiwan stations, some of which operate with over 200 kW of power, may be heard on a similar night-to-night basis. Many of these stations are also clear-channel stations, ensuring that there will be no interference or limited interference on the same frequency.

== Equipment ==
While any radio covering the mediumwave (AM radio) band can be used for DX purposes, serious DXers generally invest in a higher-quality receiver, and often a specialised indoor tuned box loop or outdoor longwire antenna.

At the lower end of the spectrum, a portable radio with a larger-than-normal internal ferrite core antenna designed for long-distance AM radio reception may be used, such as the discontinued GE Superadio, CC Radio, or the Panasonic RF-2200. The Sony ICF-SW7600G and the newer GR model are also excellent for budget minded MW dxing.

More serious DXers may spend much more for a tabletop shortwave communications receiver with good performance on the lower mediumwave frequencies using an external antenna, such as the AOR 7030+, Drake R8/R8A/R8B, Icom R-75, or Palstar R-30. Various models by Hallicrafters, Hammarlund and even home-made models from Heathkit have been popular.

In recent years, software-defined radios have become more popular for mediumwave DX. Radios like the Microtelecom Perseus and the Elad FDM-S2 can record the entire mediumwave band to a computer hard drive, which can then be played back and tuned later.

With any such receiver, a high-performance loop antenna may be employed, or in the alternative, one or more outdoor longwire Beverage antennas, sometimes many hundreds of meters long. In order to cancel out reception of unwanted stations, some DX listeners employ elaborate phased arrays of multiple Beverage antennas.

For trans-Atlantic or trans-Pacific reception, where the target station is on a 9 kHz rather than a 10 kHz multiple or vice versa, receivers with narrow RF filters are useful in rejecting adjacent broadcasts on the listener's own continent. To combat noise, DXers may use an outboard noise attenuation device, or a radio with built-in digital signal processing capabilities.

A personal computer with specialized logging software or simply a paper notebook is used to write logs. Recording devices can be used to archive memorable DX moments, or identify hard-to-hear station receptions after the fact.

== See also ==
- AM broadcasting
- Border blaster
- Clear-channel station
- DX communication
- DX station
- Ionosphere
- Skywave
- List of European medium wave transmitters
- Medium wave
- Radio propagation
- Shortwave radio
- TV-FM DX
