= Sperata acicularis =

Conservation status
- Least Concern (IUCN 3.1)

Scientific classification
- Kingdom: Animalia
- Phylum: Chordata
- Class: Actinopterygii
- Order: Siluriformes
- Family: Bagridae
- Genus: Sperata
- Species: S. acicularis

Binomial name
- Sperata acicularis Ferraris & Runge, 1999

Species of fish

Sperata acicularis is a species of bagrid catfish endemic to Myanmar where it is found in the Irrawaddy, Bago, and Great Tenasserim River systems of Myanmar.
