= Katharsis (Praying Mantis album) =

2022 album by Praying Mantis

Studio album by Praying Mantis
- Released: 28 January 2022
- Studio: Battery Studios, London
- Genre: Hard rock
- Length: 53:03
- Label: Frontiers Music
- Producer: Andy Burgess, Tino Troy

Praying Mantis studio album chronology
Gravity (2018)	Katharsis (2022)

Katharsis is the eleventh album by English rock band Praying Mantis, released in 2022. A music video was produced for the album's opener, "Cry for the Nations", as well as for "Closer to Heaven".

== Reception ==
Professional ratings
Review scores
Source	Rating
Metal1.info	7/10
Rock Hard	7.0/10
Metal.de	5/10
Blabbermouth	6/10

Katharsis received mixed to positive reviews. Rock Hard gave the album a solid rating, labelling it as "nicely arranged, 'fluffy' hard rock." Positively, a review from Metal1 stated in their review that while it might not be the strongest album in their career, "Katharsis is definitely a well-made, multi-layered and, above all, extremely high-quality rock record of the British style." A more critical review from Metal.de stated how Praying Mantis delivers solid melodic AOR, and that the troupe knows how to make stadium rock and avoid breakaways. However, they added that the record does not contain any big hits and has no real long-term standing effect. "People who tend towards Hard Rock or NWoBHM shouldn't be happy with this disc. Fans of melodic stadium rock should try the work, but don't expect any major highlights." Blabbermouth spoke well of the album, and showed appreciation towards tracks such as "Cry for the Nations", "Sacrifice", "Wheels in Motion", and "Don't Call Us Now", which they stated as "an infectious pop-rock shuffle, with the album's strongest chorus and faint echoes of rock opera and Jethro Tull." Moreover, they criticised songs like "Ain't No Rock 'n' Roll in Heaven" and "Long Time Coming" for being straightforward and prosaic in that they pale in comparison with the album's deeper cuts. Concluding with that, at its best, "Katharsis tells of a veteran band with plenty of gas in the tank and a strong grip on their highly distinctive identity."

== Tracklist ==
No.	Title	Length
1.	"Cry for the Nations"	4:55
2.	"Closer to Heaven"	4:08
3.	"Ain't No Rock 'n' Roll in Heaven"	2:46
4.	"Non Omnis Moriar"	4:16
5.	"Long Time Coming"	4:16
6.	"Sacrifice"	5:11
7.	"Wheels in Motion"	5:31
8.	"Masquerade"	4:28
9.	"Find Our Way Back Home"	5:03
10.	"Don't Call Us Now"	5:53
11.	"The Devil Never Changes"	6:32

Japan bonus track
No.	Title	Length
12.	"Find Our Way Back Home" (Acoustic Version)	5:06

== Personnel ==
Band

- John Cuijpers – lead vocals
- Andy Burgess – guitar, backing vocals, keyboards
- Tino "Daddy Long Legs" Troy – guitar, backing vocals, keyboards
- Chris "The Dak" Troy – bass, backing vocals, keyboards
- Hans In't Zandt – drums, backing vocals, percussion

Miscellaneous staff

- Rainer Kalwitz – artwork
- Steve Mann – mastering
- Andy Burgess – producer, arrangements
- Tino Troy – producer, arrangements

== Charts ==
Chart (2022)	Peak position
Swiss Albums (Schweizer Hitparade)	61
