= Sperata aorella =

Conservation status
- Least Concern (IUCN 3.1)

Scientific classification
- Kingdom: Animalia
- Phylum: Chordata
- Class: Actinopterygii
- Order: Siluriformes
- Family: Bagridae
- Genus: Sperata
- Species: S. aorella

Binomial name
- Sperata aorella (Blyth, 1858)

Synonyms
- Bagrus aorellus Blyth, 1858

Species of fish

Sperata aorella is a species of bagrid catfish that occurs in the Ganges River in India and Bangladesh.
