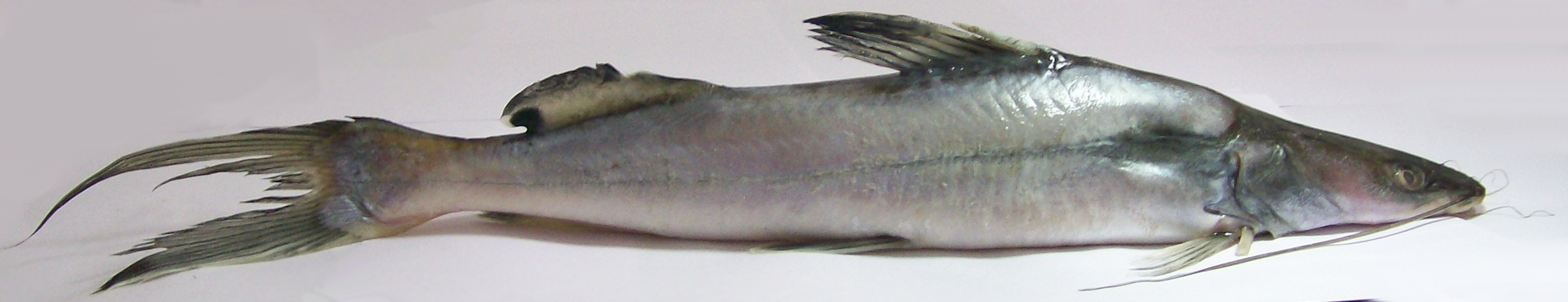

Scientific classification
- Kingdom: Animalia
- Phylum: Chordata
- Class: Actinopterygii
- Order: Siluriformes
- Family: Bagridae
- Genus: Sperata; Holly, 1939

Type species
- Bagrus lamarrii Valenciennes, 1840

Species
- 6, see text

Synonyms
- Macrones Duméril, 1856; Aoria Jordan, 1919; Aorichthys Wu, 1939; Macronichthys White & Moy-Thomas, 1940; Osteobagrus Jayaram, 1954

= Sperata =

Genus of fishes

Sperata is a genus of bagrid catfishes.

== Species ==
There are currently six recognized species in this genus:

- Sperata acicularis Ferraris & Runge, 1999
- Sperata aor (F. Hamilton, 1822) - Long-whiskered catfish
- Sperata aorella (Blyth, 1858)
- Sperata aorides (Jerdon, 1849)
- Sperata lamarrii (Valenciennes, 1840)
- Sperata seenghala (Sykes, 1839) - Giant river-catfish

== Distribution ==
Species of Sperata are found in southern Asia from Afghanistan to Thailand where they are found in a wide variety of water bodies.

== Relationship to humans ==
At least two of the Sperata species (S. aor & S. seenghala) are sport fish as well as being important food fish.
