= TV and FM DX =

Reception on the VHF frequency band

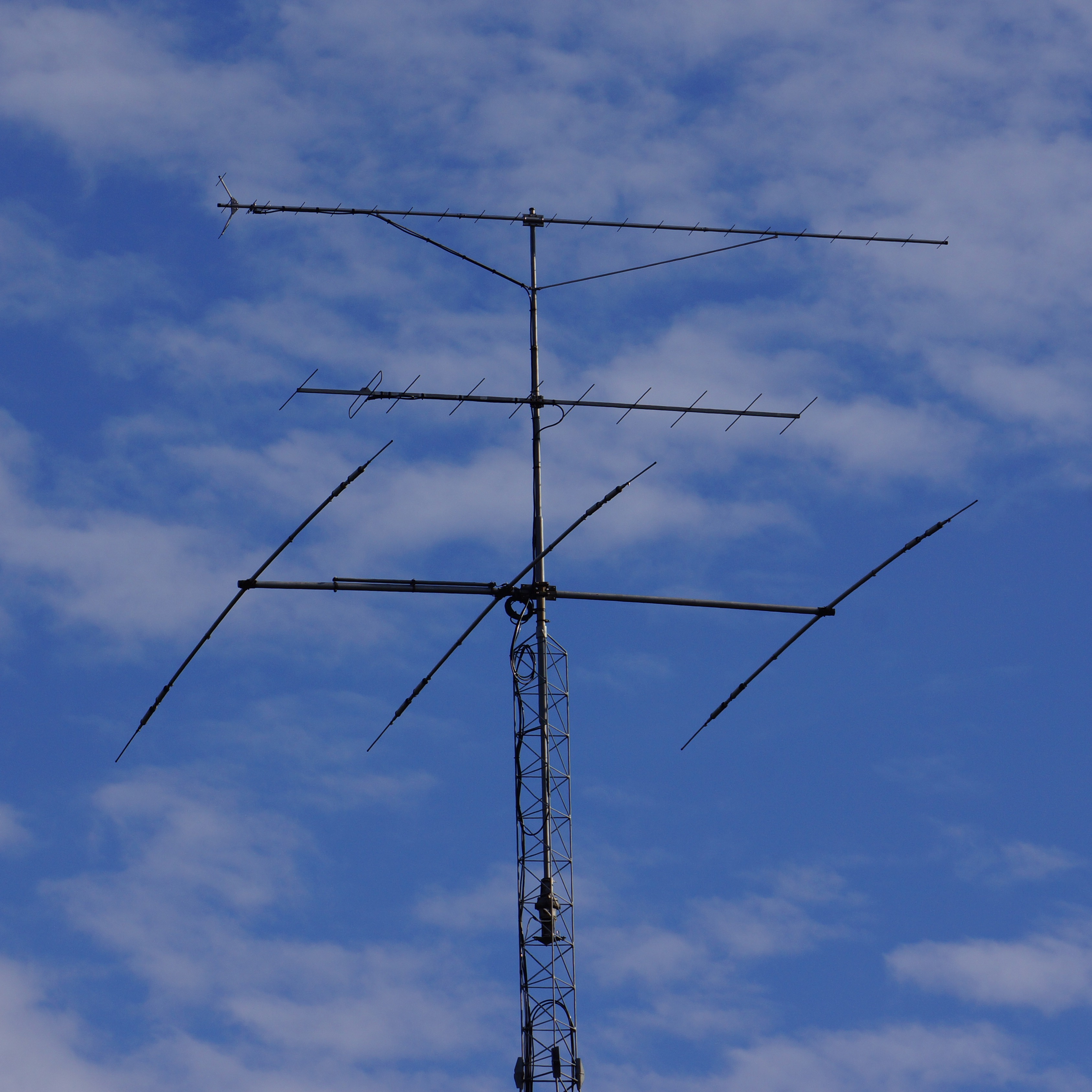
Amateur HF/UHF radio antenna

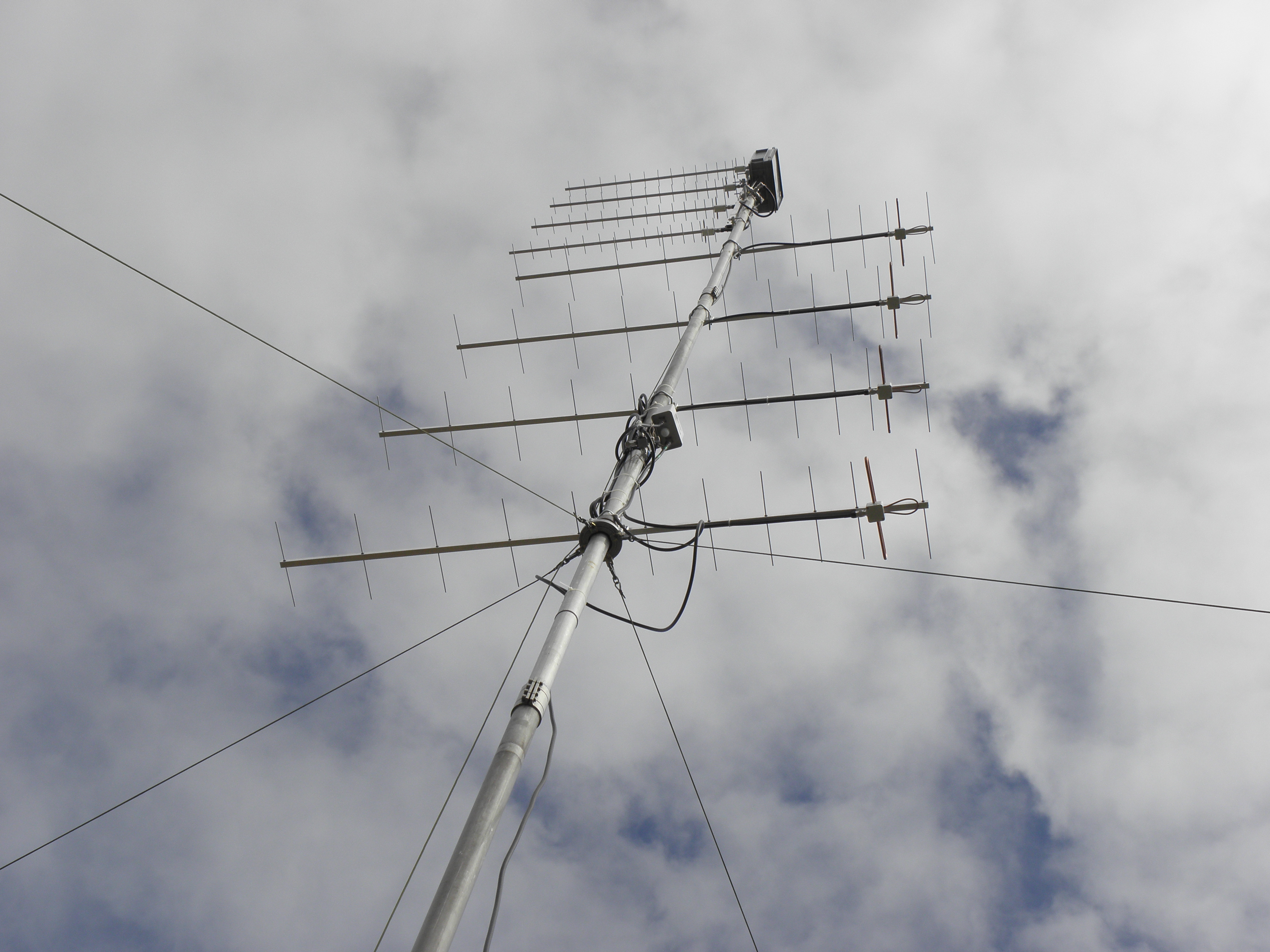
Amateur UHF radio antenna

TV DX and FM DX is the active search for distant radio or television stations received during unusual atmospheric conditions. The term DX is an old telegraphic term meaning "long distance."

VHF/UHF television and radio signals are normally limited to a maximum "deep fringe" reception service area of approximately 40–100 miles (64–161 km) in areas where the broadcast spectrum is congested, and about 50 percent farther in the absence of interference. However, providing favourable atmospheric conditions are present, television and radio signals sometimes can be received hundreds or even thousands of miles outside their intended coverage area. These signals are often received using a large outdoor antenna system connected to a sensitive TV or FM receiver, although this may not always be the case. Many times smaller antennas and receivers, such as those in vehicles, will receive stations farther than normal depending on how favourable conditions are.

While only a limited number of local stations can normally be received at satisfactory signal strengths in any given area, tuning into other channels may reveal weaker signals from adjacent areas. More consistently strong signals, especially those accentuated by unusual atmospheric conditions, can be achieved by improving the antenna system. The development of interest in TV-FM DX as a hobby has grown over time, with enthusiasts installing and upgrading HF/UHF antennae for the purpose of gaining a higher range. The TV-FM DX hobby is similar to other radio/electronic related hobbies such as amateur radio, Medium Wave DX, or short-wave radio; and organisations such as the Worldwide TV-FM DX Association have developed to coordinate and foster the further study and enjoyment of VHF/UHF television and FM broadcast DX.

== History ==
After the Alexandra Palace, London 405-line BBC channel B1 TV service was introduced in 1936, it soon became apparent that television could be received well outside the original intended service area.

For example, in November 1938, engineers at the RCA Research Station, Riverhead, Long Island, accidentally received a 3,000-mile (4,800 km) transatlantic F2 broadcast of the London 45.0 MHz, 405-line BBC Television service.

The flickering black-and-white footage (characteristic of F2 propagation) included Jasmine Bligh, one of the original BBC announcers, and a brief shot of Elizabeth Cowell, who also shared announcing duties with Jasmine, an excerpt from an unknown period costume drama and the BBC's station identification logo transmitted at the beginning and end of the day's programmes.

This reception was recorded on 16 mm movie film, and is now considered to be the only surviving example of pre-war, live British television.

The BBC temporarily ceased transmissions on September 1, 1939 as World War II began. After the BBC Television Service recommenced in 1946, distant reception reports were received from various parts of the world, including Italy, South Africa, India, the Middle East, North America and the Caribbean.

In May 1940, the Federal Communications Commission (FCC), a U.S. government agency, formally allocated the 42 – 50 MHz band for FM radio broadcasting. It was soon apparent that distant FM signals from up to 1,400 miles (2,300 km) distance would often interfere with local stations during the summer months.

Because the 42 – 50 MHz FM signals were originally intended to only cover a relatively confined service area, the sporadic long-distance signal propagation was seen as a nuisance, especially by station management.

In February 1942, the first known published long-distance FM broadcast station reception report was reported by FM magazine. The report provided details of 45.1 MHz W51C Chicago, Illinois, received in Monterrey, Mexico: "Zenith Radio Corporation, operating W51C, has received a letter from a listener in Monterrey, Mexico, telling of daily reception of this station between 3:00 P.M. and 6:00 P.M. This is the greatest distance, 1,100 miles, from which consistent reception of the 50 [kW] transmitter has been reported."

In June 1945, the FCC decided that FM would have to move from the established 42 – 50 MHz pre-war band to a new band at 88 – 108 MHz. According to 1945 and 1946 FCC documents, the three major factors which the commission considered in its decision to place FM in the 88 – 108 MHz band were sporadic E co-channel interference, F2 layer interference, and extent of coverage.

During the 1950s to early 1960s, long-distance television reports started to circulate via popular U.S. electronics hobbyist periodicals such as DXing Horizons, Popular Electronics, Television Horizons, Radio Horizons, and Radio-Electronics. In January 1960, the TV DX interest was further promoted via Robert B. Cooper's regular DXing Horizons column.

In 1957, the world record for TV DX was extended to 10,800 miles (17,400 km) with the reception of Britain's channel BBC TV in various parts of Australia. Most notably, George Palmer in Melbourne, Victoria, received viewable pictures and audio of a news program from the BBC TV London station. This BBC F2 reception was recorded on movie film.

During the early 1960s, the U.K. magazine Practical Television first published a regular TV DX column edited by Charles Rafarel. By 1970, Rafarel's column had attracted considerable interest from TV DXers worldwide. After Rafarel's death in 1971, UK TV DXer Roger Bunney continued the monthly column, which continued to be published by Television Magazine. With the demise of Television Magazine in June 2008, Bunney's column finished after 36 years of publication. In addition to the monthly TV DX column, Bunney has also published several TV DX books, including Long Distance Television Reception (TV-DX) for the Enthusiast 1981 ISBN 0-900162-71-6, and A TV DXer's Handbook 1986 ISBN 0-85934-150-X.

== Tropospheric propagation ==
Diagram of the different layers of the atmosphere.

Tropospheric propagation refers to the way radio signals travel through the lowest layer of the Earth's atmosphere, the troposphere, at altitudes up to about to 17 km (11 miles). Weather conditions in the lower atmosphere can produce radio propagation over greater ranges than normal. If a temperature inversion occurs, with upper air warmer than lower air, VHF and UHF radio waves can be refracted over the Earth's surface instead of following a straight-line path into space or into the ground. Such "tropospheric ducting" can carry signals for 800 km (500 miles) or more, far beyond usual range.

== F2 propagation ==
The F2 layer is found about 200 miles (320 km) above the Earth's surface and can reflect radio waves back toward the Earth. When the layer is particularly strong during periods of high sunspot activity, FM and TV reception can take place over 2000 miles (3000 km) or more, as the signal effectively "bounces" off the high atmospheric layer.

== Sporadic E propagation (E-skip) ==
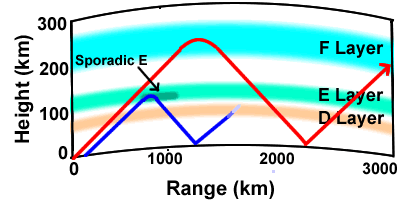
Ray diagram of sporadic E event

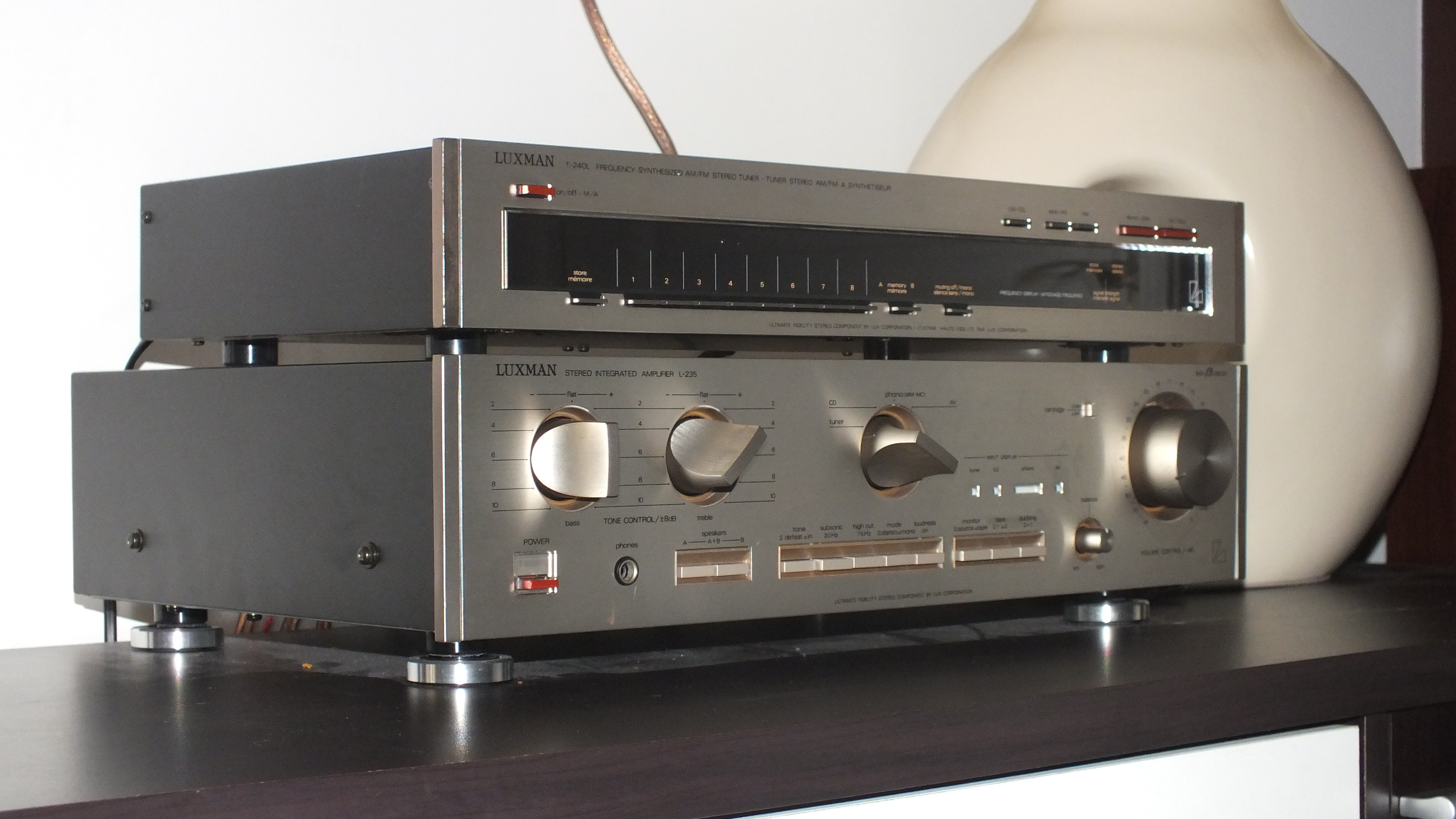
Luxman T-240L stereo FM tuner (top) and L-235 amplifier (bottom)

Sporadic E, also called E-skip, is the phenomenon of irregularly scattered patches of relatively dense ionization that develop seasonally within the E region of the ionosphere and reflect TV and FM frequencies, generally up to about 150 MHz. When frequencies reflect off multiple patches, it is referred to as multi-hop skip. E-skip allows radio waves to travel a thousand miles or even more beyond their intended area of reception. E-skip is unrelated to tropospheric ducting.

Television and FM signals received via Sporadic E can be extremely strong and range in strength over a short period from just detectable to overloading. Although polarisation shift can occur, single-hop Sporadic E signals tend to remain in the original transmitted polarisation. Long single-hop (900–1,500 miles or 1,400–2,400 kilometres) Sporadic E television signals tend to be more stable and relatively free of multipath images. Shorter-skip (400–800 miles or 640–1,290 kilometres) signals tend to be reflected from more than one part of the Sporadic E layer, resulting in multiple images and ghosting, with phase reversal at times. Picture degradation and signal-strength attenuation increases with each subsequent Sporadic E hop.

Sporadic E usually affects the lower VHF band I (TV channels 2 – 6) and band II (88 – 108 MHz FM broadcast band). The typical expected distances are about 600 to 1,400 miles (970 to 2,250 km). However, under exceptional circumstances, a highly ionized Es cloud can propagate band I VHF signals down to approximately 350 miles (560 km). When short-skip Es reception occurs, i.e., under 500 miles (800 km) in band I, there is a greater possibility that the ionized Es cloud will be capable of reflecting a signal at a much higher frequency – i.e., a VHF band 3 channel – since a sharp reflection angle (short skip) favours low frequencies, a shallower reflection angle from the same ionized cloud will favour a higher frequency.

At polar latitudes, Sporadic E can accompany auroras and associated disturbed magnetic conditions and is called Auroral-E.

No conclusive theory has yet been formulated as to the origin of Sporadic E. Attempts to connect the incidence of Sporadic E with the eleven-year Sunspot cycle have provided tentative correlations. There seems to be a positive correlation between sunspot maximum and Es activity in Europe. Conversely, there seems to be a negative correlation between maximum sunspot activity and Es activity in Australasia.

== Transequatorial propagation (TEP) ==
Discovered in 1947, transequatorial spread-F (TE) propagation makes it possible for reception of television and radio stations between 3,000–5,000 miles (4,800–8,000 km) across the equator on frequencies as high as 432 MHz. Reception of lower frequencies in the 30 – 70 MHz range are most common. If sunspot activity is sufficiently high, signals up to 108 MHz are also possible. Reception of TEP signals above 220 MHz is extremely rare. Transmitting and receiving stations should be nearly equidistant from the geomagnetic equator.

The first large-scale VHF TEP communications occurred around 1957 – 58 during the peak of solar cycle 19. Around 1970, the peak of cycle 20, many TEP contacts were made between Australian and Japanese radio amateurs. With the rise of cycle 21 starting around 1977, amateur contacts were made between Greece/Italy and Southern Africa (both South Africa and Rhodesia/Zimbabwe), and between Central and South America by TEP.

"Afternoon" and "evening" are two distinctly different types of trans-equatorial propagation.

=== Afternoon TEP ===
Afternoon TEP peaks during the mid-afternoon and early evening hours and is generally limited to distances of 4,000–5,000 miles (6,400–8,000 km). Signals propagated by this mode are limited to approximately 60 MHz. Afternoon TEP signals tend to have high signal strength and suffer moderate distortion due to multipath reflections.

=== Evening TEP ===
The second type of TEP peaks in the evening around 1900 to 2300 hours local time. Signals are possible up to 220 MHz, and even very rarely on 432 MHz. Evening TEP is quenched by moderate to severe geomagnetic disturbances. The occurrence of evening TEP is more heavily dependent on high solar activity than is the afternoon type.

During late September 2001, from 2000 to 2400 local time, VHF television and radio signals from Japan and Korea up to 220 MHz were received via evening transequatorial propagation near Darwin, Northern Territory.

== Earth – Moon – Earth (EME) propagation (Moonbounce) ==
Since 1953, radio amateurs have been experimenting with lunar communications by reflecting VHF and UHF signals off the Moon. Moonbounce allows communication on Earth between any two points that can observe the Moon at a common time.

Since the Moon's mean distance from Earth is 239,000 miles (385,000 km), path losses are very high. It follows that a typical 240 dB total path loss places great demand on high-gain receiving antennas, high-power transmissions, and sensitive receiving systems. Even when all these factors are observed, the resulting signal level is often just above the noise.

Because of the low signal-to-noise ratio, as with amateur-radio practice, EME signals can generally only be detected using narrow-band receiving systems. This means that the only aspect of the TV signal that could be detected is the field scan modulation (AM vision carrier). FM broadcast signals also feature wide frequency modulation, hence EME reception is generally not possible. There are no published records of VHF/UHF EME amateur radio contacts using FM.

=== Notable Earth-Moon-Earth (EME) DX receptions ===
During the mid-1970s, John Yurek, K3PGP, using a home-constructed, 24-foot (7.3 m), 0.6-focal-diameter parabolic dish and UHF TV dipole feed-point tuned to channel 68, received KVST-68 Los Angeles (1200 kW ERP) and WBTB-68 Newark, New Jersey via moonbounce. At the time of the experiment there were only two known transmitters operating in the United States on UHF television channel 68, the main reason why this channel was selected for EME experiments.

For three nights in December 1978, astronomer Dr. Woodruff T. Sullivan III used the 305-metre Arecibo radio telescope to observe the Moon at a variety of frequencies. This experiment demonstrated that the lunar surface is capable of reflecting terrestrial band III (175 – 230 MHz) television signals back to Earth. While never confirmed, FM broadcast EME reception may have been possible using the Arecibo dish antenna.

In 2002, physicist Dr. Tony Mann demonstrated that a single high-gain UHF yagi antenna, low noise masthead preamplifier, VHF/UHF synthesised communications receiver, and personal computer with FFT spectrum analyser software could be used to successfully detect extremely weak UHF television carriers via EME.

== Auroral propagation ==
An aurora is most likely to occur during periods of high solar activity when there is a high probability of a large solar flare. When such an eruption occurs, charged particles from the flare may spiral towards Earth arriving about a day later. This may or may not cause an aurora: if the interstellar magnetic field has same polarity, the particles do not get coupled to the geomagnetic field efficiently. Besides sunspot-related active solar surface areas, other solar phenomena that produce particles causing auroras, such as re-occurring coronal holes spraying out intense solar wind. These charged particles are affected and captured by the geomagnetic field and the various radiation belts surrounding earth. The aurora-producing relativistic electrons eventually precipitate towards Earth's magnetic poles, resulting in an aurora which disrupts short-wave communications (SID) due to ionospheric/magnetic storms in the D, E, and F layers. Various visual effects are also seen in the sky towards the north – aptly called the Northern Lights. The same effect occurs in the Southern Hemisphere, but the visual effects are towards the south. The auroral event starts by onset of geomagnetic storm, followed by number of sub-storms over the next day or so.

The aurora produces a reflecting sheet (or metric sized columns) which tends to lie in a vertical plane. The result of this vertical ionospheric "curtain" is reflection of signals well into the upper VHF band. The reflection is very aspect sensitive. Since the reflecting sheet lies towards the poles, it follows that reflected signals will arrive from that general direction. An active region or coronal hole may persist for some 27 days resulting in a second aurora when the Sun has rotated. There is a tendency for auroras to occur around the March/April, September/October equinox periods, when the geomagnetic field is at right angle to Sun for efficient charged particle coupling. Signals propagated by aurora have a characteristic hum effect, which makes video and audio reception difficult. Video carriers, as heard on a communications receiver, no longer can be heard as a pure tone.

A typical radio aurora occurs in the afternoon, which produces strong and distorted signals for few hours. The local midnight sub-storming usually produces weaker signals, but with less distortion by Doppler from gyrating electrons.

Frequencies up to 200 MHz can be affected by auroral propagation.

== Meteor scatter propagation ==
Meteor scatter occurs when a signal bounces off a meteor's ionized trail.

When a meteor strikes earth's atmosphere, a cylindrical region of free electrons is formed at the height of the E layer. This slender, ionized column is relatively long, and when first formed is sufficiently dense to reflect and scatter television and radio signals, generally observable from 25 MHz upwards through UHF TV, back to earth. Consequently, an incident television or radio signal is capable of being reflected up to distances approaching that of conventional Sporadic E propagation, typically about 1500 km (1000 miles). A signal reflected by such meteor ionisation can vary in duration from fractions of a second up to several minutes for intensely ionized trails. The events are classified as overdense and underdense, depending on the electron line-density (related to used frequency) of the trail plasma. The signal from overdense trail has a longer signal decay associated with fading and is physically a reflection from the ionized cylinder surface, while an underdense trail gives a signal of short duration, which rises fast and decays exponentially and is scattered from individual electrons inside the trail.

Frequencies in the range of 50 to 80 MHz have been found to be optimum for meteor scatter propagation. The 88 – 108 MHz FM broadcast band is also highly suited for meteor scatter experiments. During the major meteor showers, with extremely intense trails, band III 175 – 220 MHz signal reception can occur.

Ionized trails generally reflect lower frequencies for longer periods (and produce stronger signals) compared to higher frequencies. For example, an 8-second burst on 45.25 MHz may only cause a 4-second burst at 90.5 MHz.

The effect of a typical visually seen single meteor (of size 0.5 mm) shows up as a sudden "burst" of signal of short duration at a point not normally reached by the transmitter. The combined effect of several meteors impinging on earth's atmosphere, while perhaps too weak to provide long-term ionisation, is thought to contribute to the existence of the night-time E layer.

The optimum time for receiving RF reflections off sporadic meteors is the early morning period, when the velocity of earth relative to the velocity of the particles is greatest which also increases the number of meteors occurring on the morning-side of the earth, but some sporadic meteor reflections can be received at any time of the day, least in the early evening.

The annual major meteor showers are detailed below:

- January 3 – 4: Quadrantids
- April 22 – 23: Lyrids
- May 5 – 6: Eta Aquariids
- June 9 – 10: Arietids & zeta-Perseids
- August 12 – 13: Perseids
- October 21 – 22: Orionids
- November 3 – 5: Taurids
- November 16 – 18: Leonids (Note: activity varies, outburst only at about 33 year interval)
- December 13 – 14: Geminids
- December 22 – 23: Ursids

For observing meteor shower-related radio signals, the shower's radiant must be above the (propagation mid path) horizon. Otherwise no meteor of the shower can hit the atmosphere along the propagation path and no reflections from the shower's meteor trails can be observed.

== Satellite UHF TVRO DX ==
Although not by strict definition terrestrial TV DX, satellite UHF TVRO reception is related in certain aspects. For example, reception of satellite signals requires sensitive receiving systems and large outdoor antenna systems. However, unlike terrestrial TV DX, satellite UHF TV reception is far easier to predict. The geosynchronous satellite at 22,375 miles (36,009 km) height is a line of sight reception source. If the satellite is above the horizon, it can be generally received, if it is below the horizon, reception is not possible.

=== Notable Satellite UHF TVRO DX receptions ===
- In December 1975, Stephen Birkill, Sheffield, England, was the first DXer to receive viewable pictures from the 860 MHz Indian ATS-6 satellite, which was in synchronous orbit over Central Africa, for the purpose of providing educational television programs to the Indian subcontinent.
- In 1978, Ian Roberts, South Africa, received 714 MHz television pictures from the Soviet UHF Ekran-class Statsionar-T satellite.
- In 2022, amateur radio operator Derek OK9SGC, Czech Republic, received one of the few remaining analog terrestrial transmissions from Turkmenistan, which is being periodically picked up and relayed by newer Russian Meridian satellites.

== Digital modes ==
Digital radio and digital television can also be received; however, there is much greater difficulty with reception of weak signals due to the cliff effect, particularly with the ATSC TV standard mandated in the U.S. However, when the signal is strong enough to be decoded identification is much easier than with analog TV as the picture is guaranteed to be noise-free when present. For DVB-T, hierarchical modulation may allow a lower-definition signal to be received even if the details of the full signal cannot be decoded. In reality, though, it's actually much more difficult to get DVB-T E-skip reception as the lowest channel DVB-T transmissions operate on is channel E5 which is 178 MHz. A unique issue observed on analog TV at the end of the DTV transition in the United States was that very distant analog stations were viewable in the hours after the permanent shutdown of local analog transmitters in June 2009. This was particularly pronounced because June is one of the strongest months for DX reception on VHF, and most digital stations were assigned to UHF.

== See also ==
- Federal Standard 1037C
- MW DX
- Skywave
- Radio propagation
- Thermal fade
- Clear-channel station
- In Channel Select (ICS)
- DYNAS
