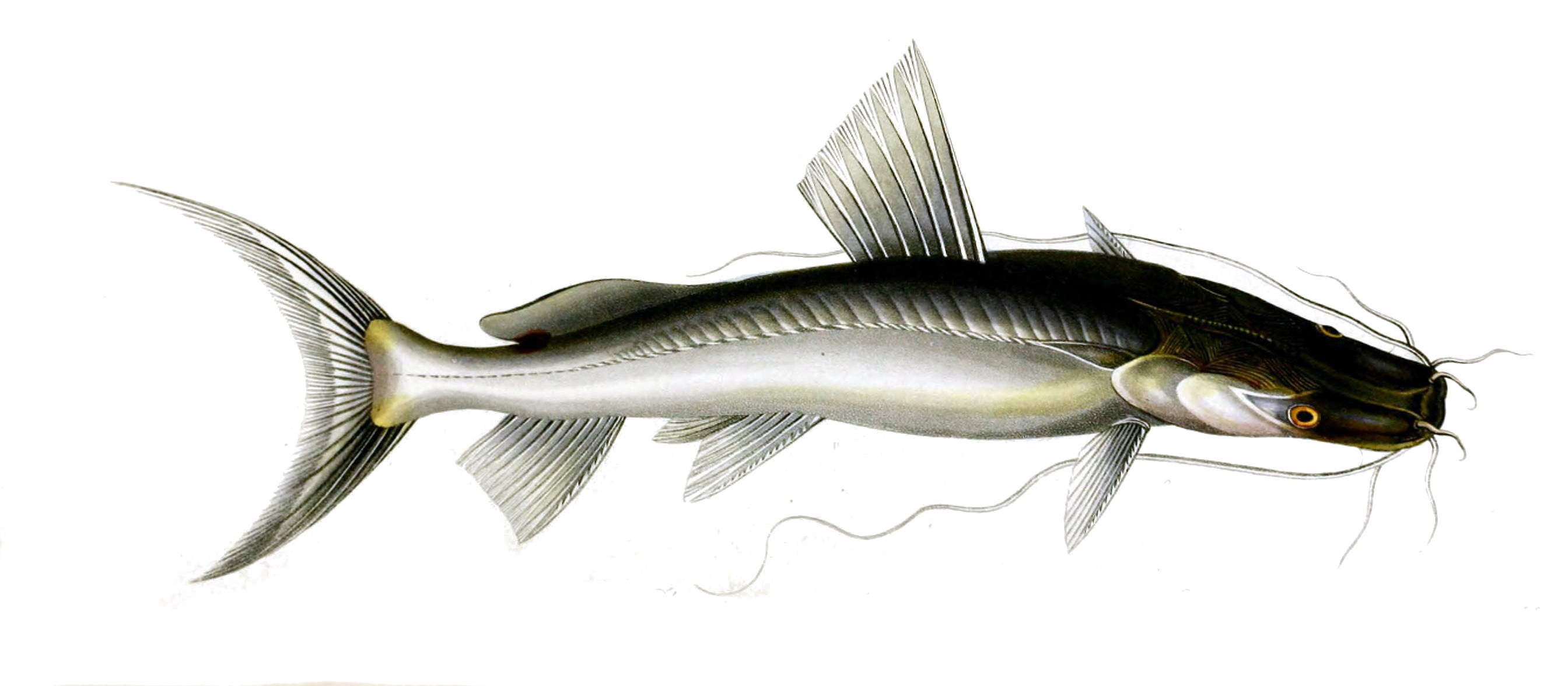

Conservation status
- Least Concern (IUCN 3.1)

Scientific classification
- Kingdom: Animalia
- Phylum: Chordata
- Class: Actinopterygii
- Order: Siluriformes
- Family: Bagridae
- Genus: Sperata
- Species: S. seenghala

Binomial name
- Sperata seenghala (Sykes, 1839)

Synonyms
- Sperata sarwari (Mirza, Nawaz & Javed, 1992); Aorichthys seenghala (Sykes, 1841)

= Sperata seenghala =

Species of fish

Sperata seenghala, the Giant river-catfish, is a species of bagrid catfish. It is known locally as Guizza, Guizza ayer, Auri, Ari, Pogal, Singhara and Seenghala, among other names. It is found in southern Asia in the countries of Afghanistan, Pakistan, India, Nepal and Bangladesh with reports of occurrence in Myanmar, Thailand and Yunnan, China. It can reach a length of 150 cm (4 ft 11 in), though lengths up to 40 cm (1 ft 4 in) are more usual. It is commercially fished for human consumption as well as being a popular gamefish with a reputation for being a good fighter when hooked. It is carnivorous in diet. It can be distinguished from other Sperata species by its spatulate, blunt snout, relatively short barbels and mouth that is only 1/3 as wide as the head is long.

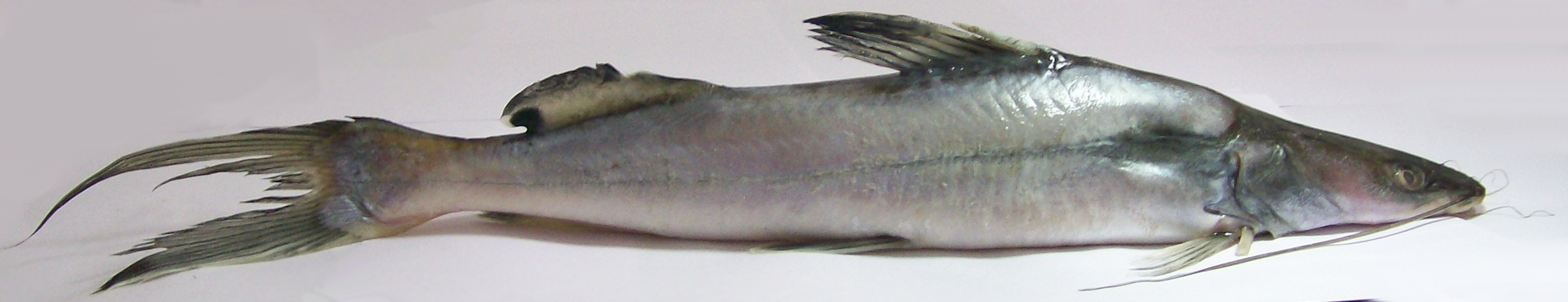
Sperata seenghala

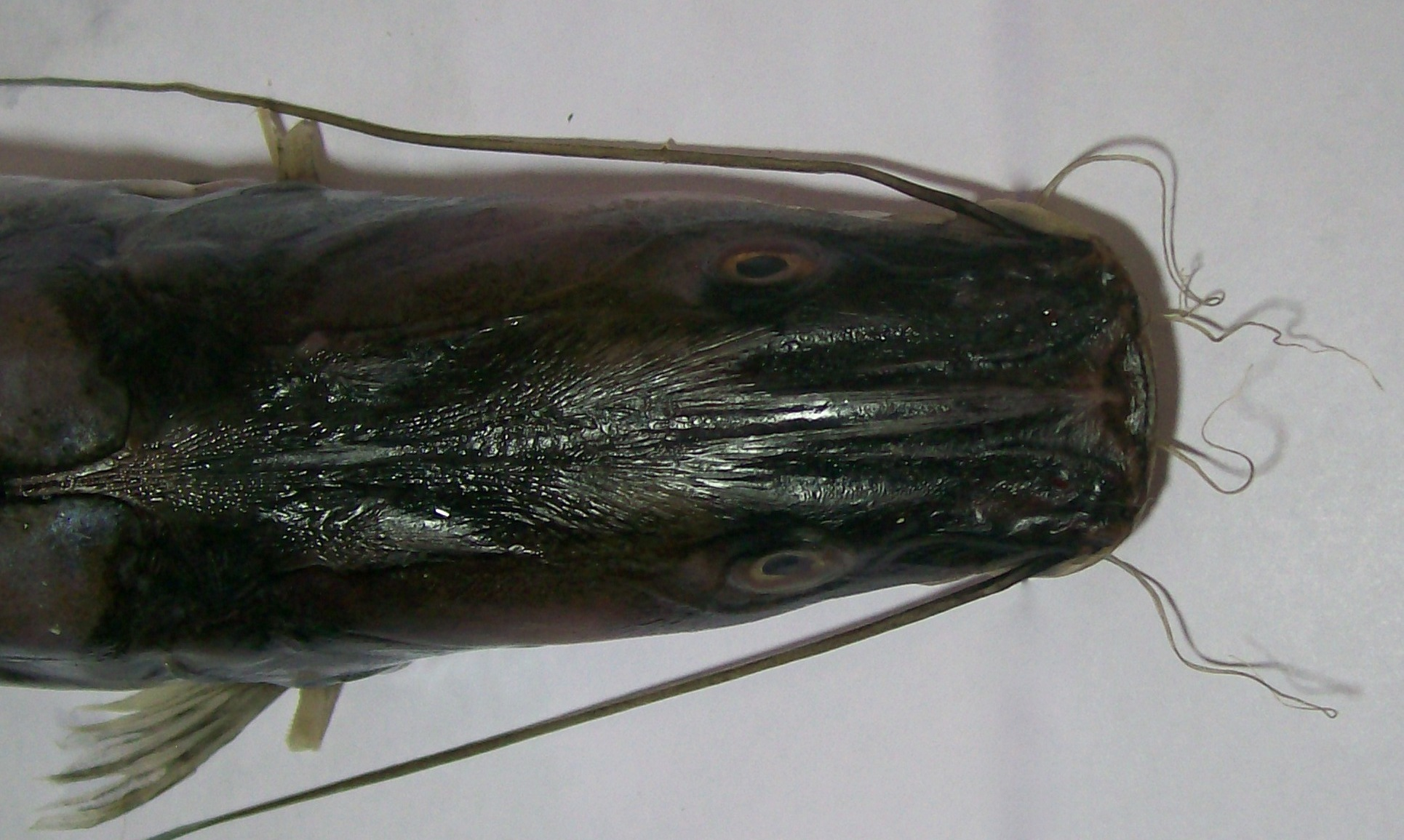
dorsal view of head showing snout shape
