= DYNAS =

Radio filtering and tuning technology

DYNAS (from Dynamic Selectivity) is a dynamic analog filtering and tuning technology to improve the reception of FM radio broadcasts under adverse conditions.

== Overview ==
The trademarked DYNAS system is based on the same principles as the In Channel Select (ICS) system by H.u.C. Elektronik. The novel tracking filter arrangement was originally conceived by the German engineer Jens Hansen in 1982. The concept was prototyped as High Select in summer 1983. With funding from innovation funds of the city of Berlin, Hansen left Bosch/Blaupunkt to start, with companion Klaus Müller-Catito, his own company H.u.C. Elektronik in 1984. (Note: Sources differ in regard to the exact founding date of Hansen's company from summer 1983^{[A]} to 1984 to June 1985.^{[B]}) (Note: While most sources state the company name as Hansen & Co., Hansen/Catito Elektronik, H&C Elektronik or H.u.C Elektronik GmbH, one source instead mentions a Berlin-based company named Sico-Elektronic GmbH which won the 1984 Berlin Innovation Prize for inventing an enhanced reception system for frequency-modulated radio signals.^{[C]} (One of Hansen's patents was even filed by a company named "Sita Electronik GmbH" [sic].)) When licensing negotiations with his former employer failed, the system was marketed in the early 1990s as DYNAS by the German Telefunken electronic (a spin-off of AEG-Telefunken and DASA, firming as TEMIC TELEFUNKEN microelectronic since 1992), who, with the related Telefunken Semiconductors (the former AEG-Telefunken Halbleiterwerk in Heilbronn), also designed integrated circuits implementing the system, the TEMIC/TFK U4290B (stand-alone FM IF DYNAS system in 68-pin PLCC package), U4291B (DYNAS coprocessor) and U4292B (software-controlled DYNAS system in 44-pin SSO package).

Compared to conventional receivers, DYNAS has a more than 26 dB better selectivity and a typically twice as good sensitivity (improved by 6 dB) thereby almost doubling the reception area and allowing to receive even extremely noisy stations. This is achieved by an adaptive bandwidth of the IF filter and by dynamically tracking of the center frequency of the IF filter in real-time.

With a transmitter spacing of 200 kHz an undisturbed reception in stereo is possible, with 100 kHz a largely undisturbed mono reception is still possible.

The principle has been adopted in some high-end FM tuners like the analog Burmester Tuner 915 (1991) or the digital synthesizer tuners Onkyo (Note: Some Onkyo product catalogs seem to suggest that the Onkyo Integra T-9890DSR (1995) would support DYNAS as well, however, neither the user nor the service manual support this.) Integra T-4970 (1992) and T-488F (1993) as well as in various car radios, such as the Alpine 7619R (1989) and 1310R/3681 (1990), the JVC KS-CG10 (1992), the Clarion CRX121R (1993), CRX123R (1993), CRX121RM and CRX123RM, the Gelhard GXR 990S (1993) or the Conrad Soundcraft AR6800 DYNAS, (Note: The Conrad Soundcraft AR6800 DYNAS car radio uses a TEMIC Tuner 1310 FAB 3X1 781 module. The unidentified DYNAS chip on the PCB is a glue-top chip on board (COB).) which are particularly affected by difficult and rapidly changing reception conditions.

== Similar technologies ==
The In Channel Select (ICS) system by H.u.C. Elektronik in 1984 is a DYNAS predecessor mainly for narrowband FM receivers. It is based on the High Select tracking filter (German: Mitlauffilter aka MLF) developed by Jens Hansen since 1982. ICS improved the selectivity by about 20 dB and the sensitivity by about 6 dB.

A very similar technology is the Active Real-time Tracing System (ARTS), as was implemented in the Pioneer Elite F-91 and some versions of the F-717 (Note: Pioneer sold two completely different looking tuners under the F-717 name in 1987: The first one, labelled Digital Synthesizer Tuner F-717 on the front panel as sold in various international markets in 1987, is based on the F-77 (1985) tuner and does not support Active Real-time Tracing System (ARTS). It was also sold as F-717L for a version with addition LW band capabilities. The second one, labelled Reference Digital Synthesizer Tuner F-717 on the front, does support ARTS (also labelled as such on the front panel) and was sold at least in Japan in 1987. This is a variant of the F-91 (1987), but features an additional front panel switch to select from two FM antenna inputs at the back.) high-end tuners in 1987.

Super Sound Tracing (SST) is a similar technology by Sony affecting the RF rather than the IF stage. A four-stage SST system was implemented in high-end tuners such as the ST-S555ESX (1986), ST-S333ESX (1986), ST-S444ESX/ST-S700ES (1987), ST-S800ES (1987) and ST-S333ESX II (1987)/ST-S730ES (1988). Advanced SST, dividing the tuning range into 32 sections, was implemented in some model variants (Note: Super Sound Tracing (SST) was not implemented in all locale-specific model variants of these tuners. For example, according to the service manual,^{[D]} in the UK, AEP, German and Italian versions of the ST-S770ES the real estate on the PCB for the SST circuitry was left unpopulated^{[E]}^{[F]} and bypassed despite Sony advertising the tuner's SST feature in German product catalogs up to mid-1993.^{[G]} A similar situation exists at least for the US, AEP, E, G and I variants of the ST-S707ES^{[H]}^{[I]} and some variants of the ST-SA5ES. In the case of the ST-SA5ES even two vastly different PCB layouts exist: the first being very similar to the predecessor series (ST-S739ES/ST-S770ES/ST-S707ES and ST-S333ESG/ST-S333ESA/ST-S333ESJ), the second one a completely new design (yet different from the successor ST-SA50ES).) of the ST-S739ES, ST-S333ESG (1989)/ST-S770ES (1990) ST-S333ESA (1991), ST-S333ESJ (1993), ST-S707ES (1993) and ST-SA5ES (1994/1996).

Blaupunkt's Sharx technology, as introduced in 1997 in the Modena & Lausanne RD 148 car radios with "DigiCeiver", is a similar digital solution implemented in software. The original Sharx implementation still relied on a bank of switchable analog ceramic resonators for the IF filter stage before the A/D conversion for further processing of the signal in the DSP section. Around 2000, the switchable IF filter moved into the digital domain as well, that is, it was integrated into the DigiCeiver/TwinCeiver chip leaving only the first stage of the IF filter a discrete part.

== See also ==
- Körting Syntektor
- FM DX
- Frequency-following receiver
- Threshold extension demodulation
- Frequency demodulator using feedback or FM, FM feedback (FMFB)
