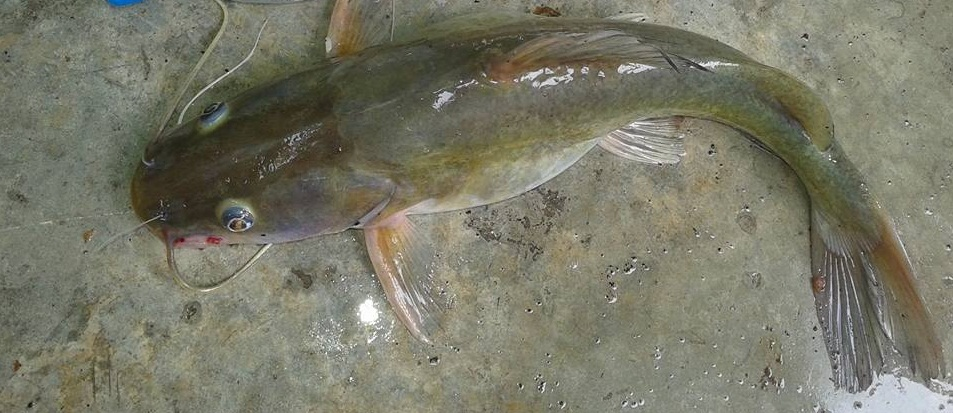

Conservation status
- Least Concern (IUCN 3.1)

Scientific classification
- Kingdom: Animalia
- Phylum: Chordata
- Class: Actinopterygii
- Division: Teleostei
- Order: Siluriformes
- Family: Bagridae
- Genus: Sperata
- Species: S. aor

Binomial name
- Sperata aor (F. Hamilton, 1822)

Synonyms
- Pimelodus aor Hamilton, 1822; Aoria aor (Hamilton, 1822); Aorichthys aor (Hamilton, 1822); Macrones aor (Hamilton, 1822); Mystus aor (Hamilton, 1822); Orichthys aor (Hamilton, 1822)

= Sperata aor =

Species of fish

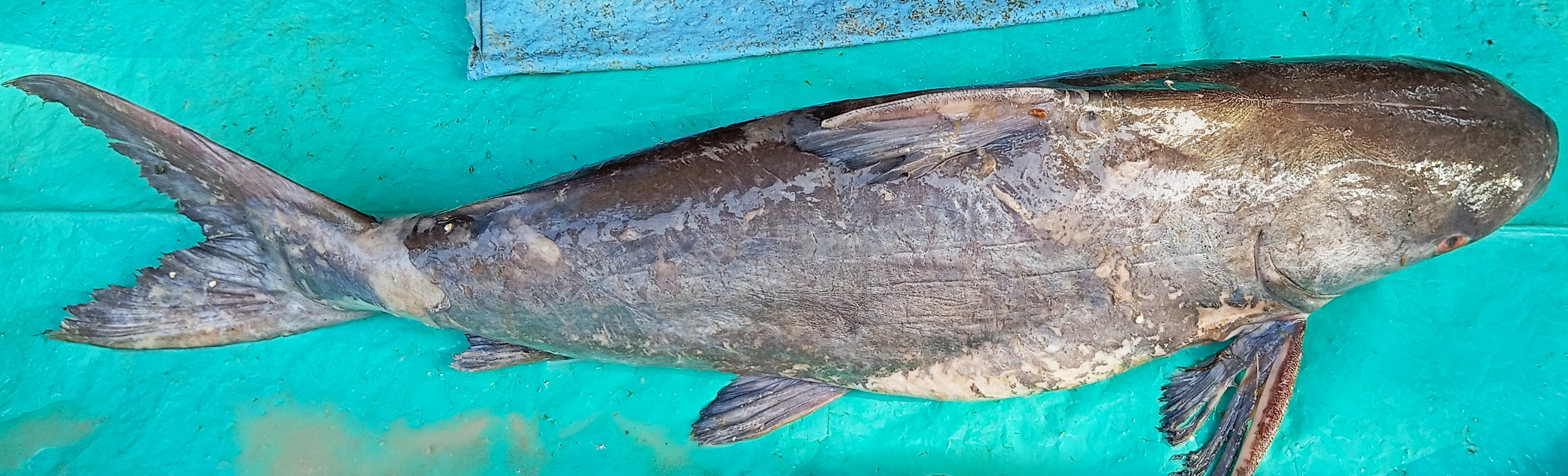
Sperata aor (Long-whiskered catfish) of West Bengal, India

Sperata aor, the long-whiskered catfish (Bengali: আড় aṛ, Assamese: আঁৰি ãri), is a species of catfish of the family Bagridae found in southern Asia in the nations of India, Pakistan, Nepal, Bangladesh and Myanmar. It grows to a length of 180 centimetres (71 in) and is commercially fished for human consumption. It is also a popular gamefish.

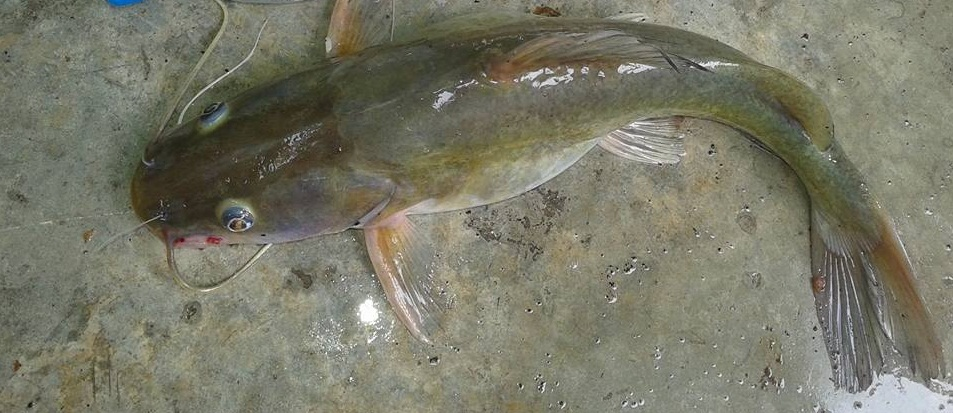
Sperata aor of Bangladesh

== Culture ==
In Myanmar, they are known as Nga-gyaung by local fishers. Fishers use live prawns as bait and leave the hook in the river overnight. The next day the fishers return to retrieve their catch.
