= Adult-oriented rock =

Adult-oriented rock or AOR has multiple meanings in the music world. It may refer to:

- Arena rock (also known as AOR, melodic rock and stadium rock), a style of commercially oriented rock music
- Album-oriented rock (AOR), a radio format created in the United States in the 1970s
  - Adult album alternative, a radio format that evolved from album-oriented rock
- Adult-oriented rock, a synonym for soft rock
- West Coast sound, a mid-to-late 1970s rock subgenre, more recently referred to as yacht rock

== See also ==
- AOR (disambiguation)
