= Time Tells No Lies =

1981 debut album by Praying Mantis

Studio album by Praying Mantis
- Released: 3 April 1981
- Studio: Battery, London
- Genre: Hard rock, heavy metal
- Length: 39:04
- Label: Arista
- Producer: Tim Friese-Greene

Praying Mantis studio album chronology
Time Tells No Lies (1981)	Predator in Disguise (1991)

Singles from Time Tells No Lies
- 1. "Cheated" Released: January 1981; 2. "All Day and All of the Night" Released: March 1981

Professional ratings
Review scores
Source	Rating
AllMusic	4/5 stars
Sputnikmusic	4/5

Time Tells No Lies is the debut album by English rock band Praying Mantis, released on 3 April 1981.

== Release ==
Time Tells No Lies was released in 1981 after the band signed a worldwide deal with Arista Records following the Reading Rock '80 festival. Some copies came with a one sided A4 merchandise insert. It peaked at number 60 on the UK Albums Chart in April 1981 where it stayed for two weeks, while Cheated, the lead single peaked at number 69 on the UK Singles Charts.

== Artwork ==
The original cover is by Rodney Matthews.

== Reception and legacy ==
Jack Butler-Terry of Metal Hammer said the album was "an absolute gem."

== Track listing ==
Side one
No.	Title	Writer(s)	Lead Vocals	Length
1.	"Cheated"	Steve Carroll, Tino Troy	Carroll	3:53
2.	"All Day and All of the Night" (The Kinks cover)	Ray Davies	T. Troy	2:58
3.	"Running for Tomorrow"	Dave Potts, T. Troy, Chris Troy, Carroll	Carroll	3:41
4.	"Rich City Kids"	T. Troy, C. Troy	T. Troy	3:48
5.	"Lovers to the Grave"	C. Troy, T. Troy	C. Troy	4:52

Side two
No.	Title	Writer(s)	Lead Vocals	Length
6.	"Panic in the Streets"	T. Troy, Potts, Sandra Vermeulen	T. Troy	3:43
7.	"Beads of Ebony"	T. Troy	C. Troy	5:28
8.	"Flirting With Suicide"	T. Troy, C. Troy, Carroll, Potts	T. Troy	5:04
9.	"Children of the Earth"	T. Troy, C. Troy	C. Troy	5:37
Total length:				39:04

== Personnel ==
Praying Mantis

- Tino Troy – guitars, vocals
- Steve Carroll – guitars, vocals
- Chris Troy – bass guitar, vocals
- Dave Potts – drums, all percussion

Additional personnel

- Tim Friese-Greene – production, piano on "Rich City Kids"
- Mike Shipley – engineering
- Freddy Silva – photography

== Charts ==
Chart (1981)	Peak position
UK Albums (OCC)	60
