= App-o-rama =

App-O-Rama (also known as AppORama, Application-O-Rama, App-a-Rama, AOR) refers to a strategy of completing multiple credit account applications in a relatively short period of time to try and trick or fool financial institutions. This may be to obtain promotional temporary lower interest rates or signup bonuses while avoiding rejection by the financial institutions or to build up a credit score quickly. It refers to a frenzy of applications, and most frequently refers to applications for financial products, such as loans, credit cards, and bank deposit accounts. However, it can also include insurance applications, brokerage account applications.

Since many of these financial products require a credit inquiry and evaluate one's credit worthiness at that point in time, the object is to perform all applications at the same time, preferably when one's credit profile is in top condition. Since 2008, App-o-Rama has become more difficult as issuers tightened credit and restricted approvals to only the most creditworthy customers after the Great Recession. Issuers have reduced the number of active cards from a single bank given to a consumer. Inactive lines are being eliminated, zero percent balance transfer offers are shortened, and credit limits have been reduced.

== History ==
In the early 2000s the term gained popularity in the FatWallet.com Finance Forum. There are several offline and online books, papers and illustrations of this term and how the strategy is implemented. The Wall Street Journal summed up the application frenzy up in one article.

Money Economics published an article on August 2, 2007, analyzing the maximum actual profit one can obtain from this interest rate arbitrage. It concluded that the strategy was less successful than suggested.

Since most applications require credit checks, those who have good credit have a higher chance of being successful.

== Advantages and Consequences ==
=== Advantages ===
- To obtain many balance transfer offers, to move higher rate debts to a lower rate; or to use 0% funds to invest in money market account or high interest savings. This practice is often known as stoozing, and was first made popular in the UK.
- To obtain as many signup bonus rewards as possible.
- To establish or build credit history.

=== Consequences ===
- Temporary drop in credit score due to new inquiries and new accounts.
- Possible denials of additional new cards from same issuer or even having existing cards closed.
