= AOR (company) =

Japanese manufacturer of radio equipment

Authority on Radio Communications, Ltd.
- Industry: Radio electronics
- Founded: 1977
- Headquarters: Tokyo, Japan
- Products: Radio communications equipment
- Website: www.aorja.com

AOR, Ltd. (Authority on Radio Communications, Ltd.) is a Japanese-based manufacturer of radio equipment, including transceivers, scanners, antennas and frequency monitors.

Established in 1977 when two radio amateurs decided to go professional. Based in Tokyo, Japan, they also have offices in the United Kingdom and the United States, and manufacturing facilities in Japan and the United Kingdom.

== Products ==
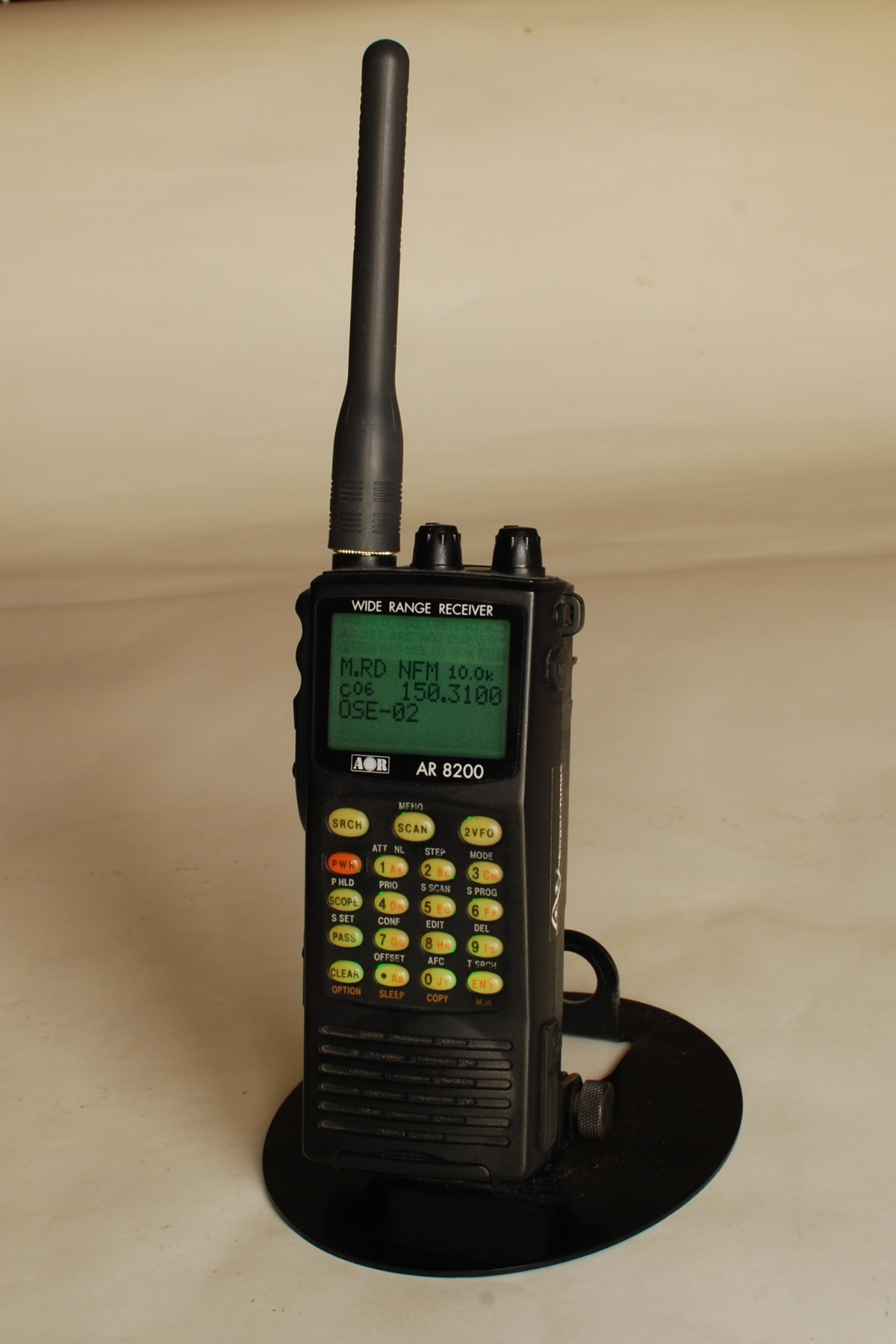
AOR AR-8200 portable communications receiver.

- AOR AR-240 - amateur radio transceiver
- AOR AR-2001 - desktop communications receiver and scanner
- AOR AR-8200 - handheld communications receiver and radio scanner
- AOR AR-3000A - tabletop and mobile wideband communications receiver and scanner

== See also ==
- Radio scanner
